= Shrewsbury =

County town of Shropshire, England

- Market town and civil parish
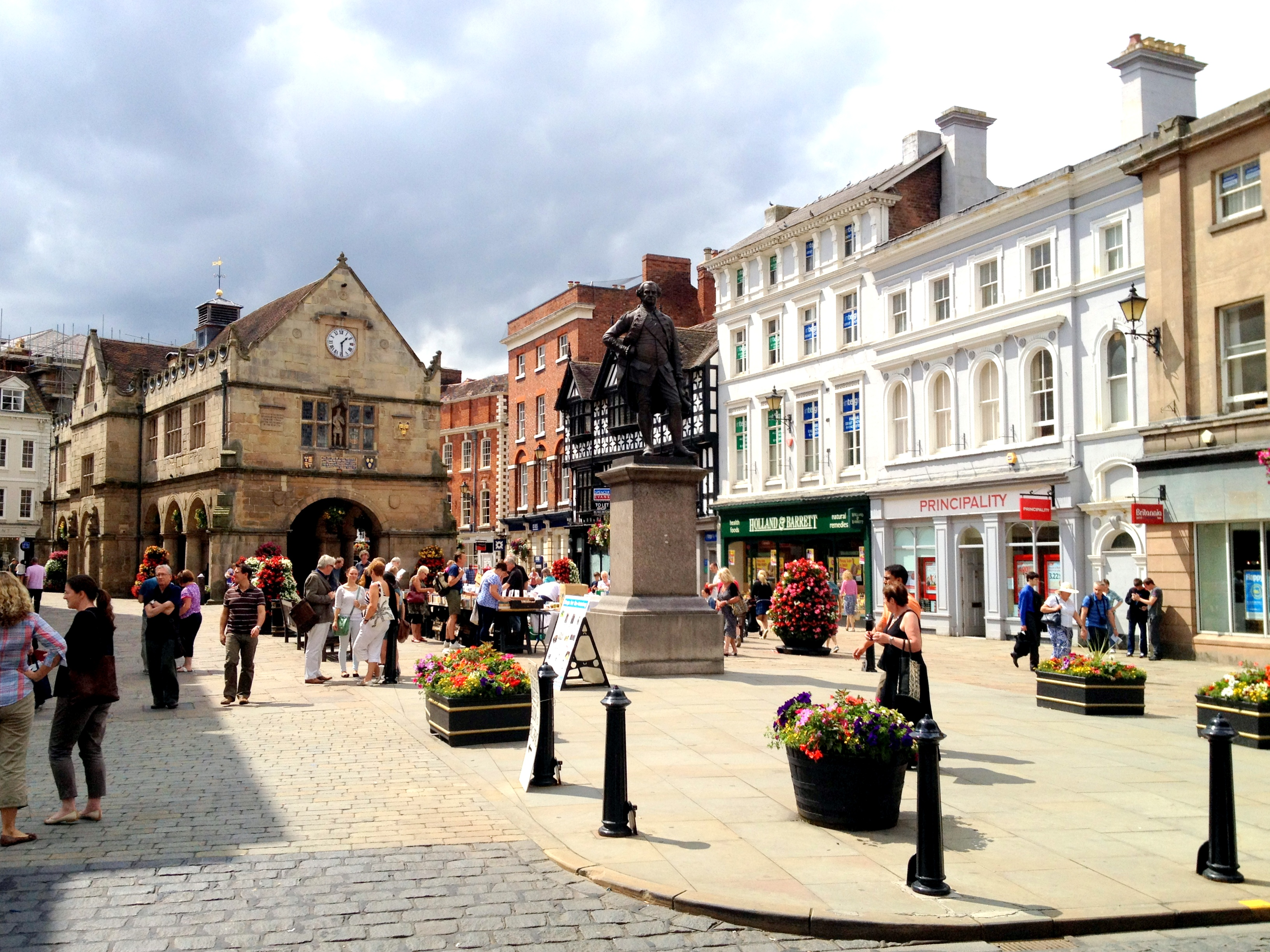
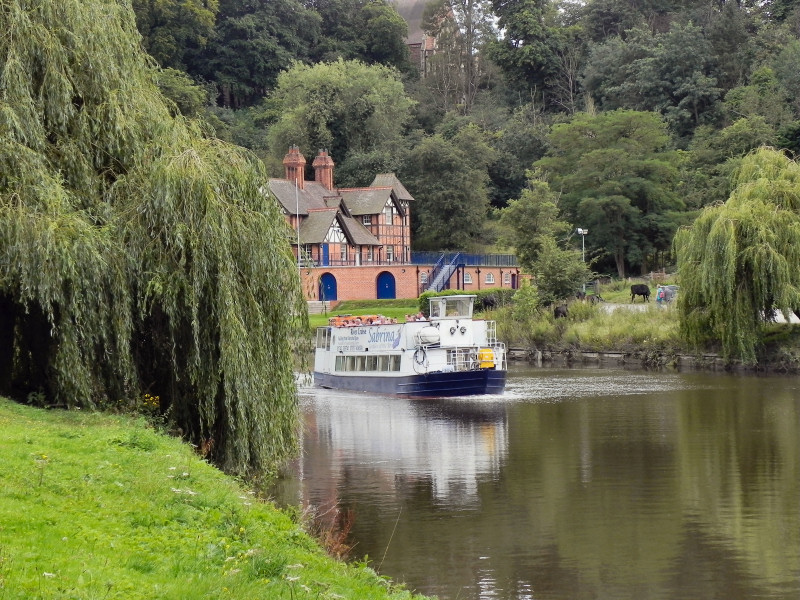
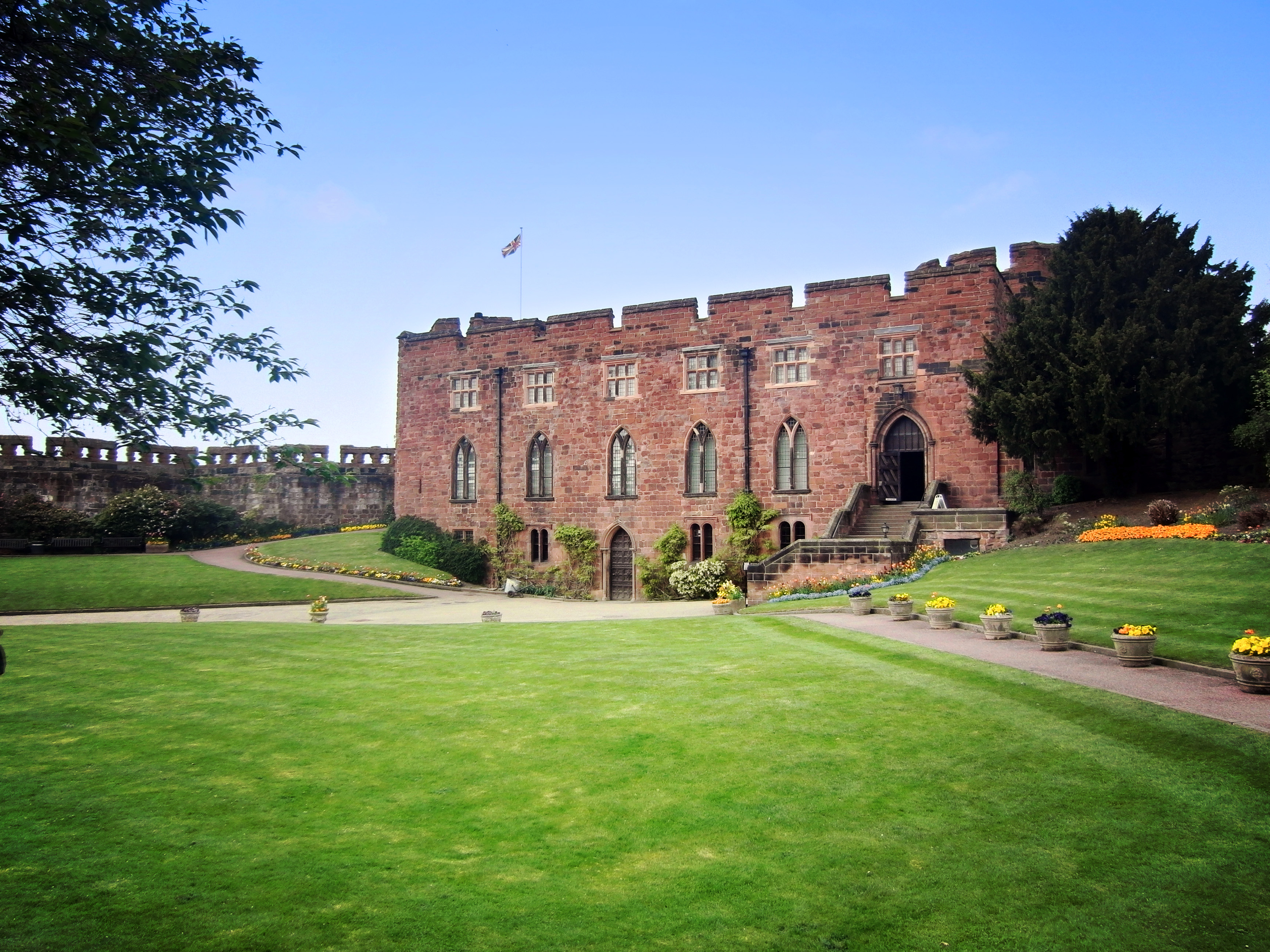
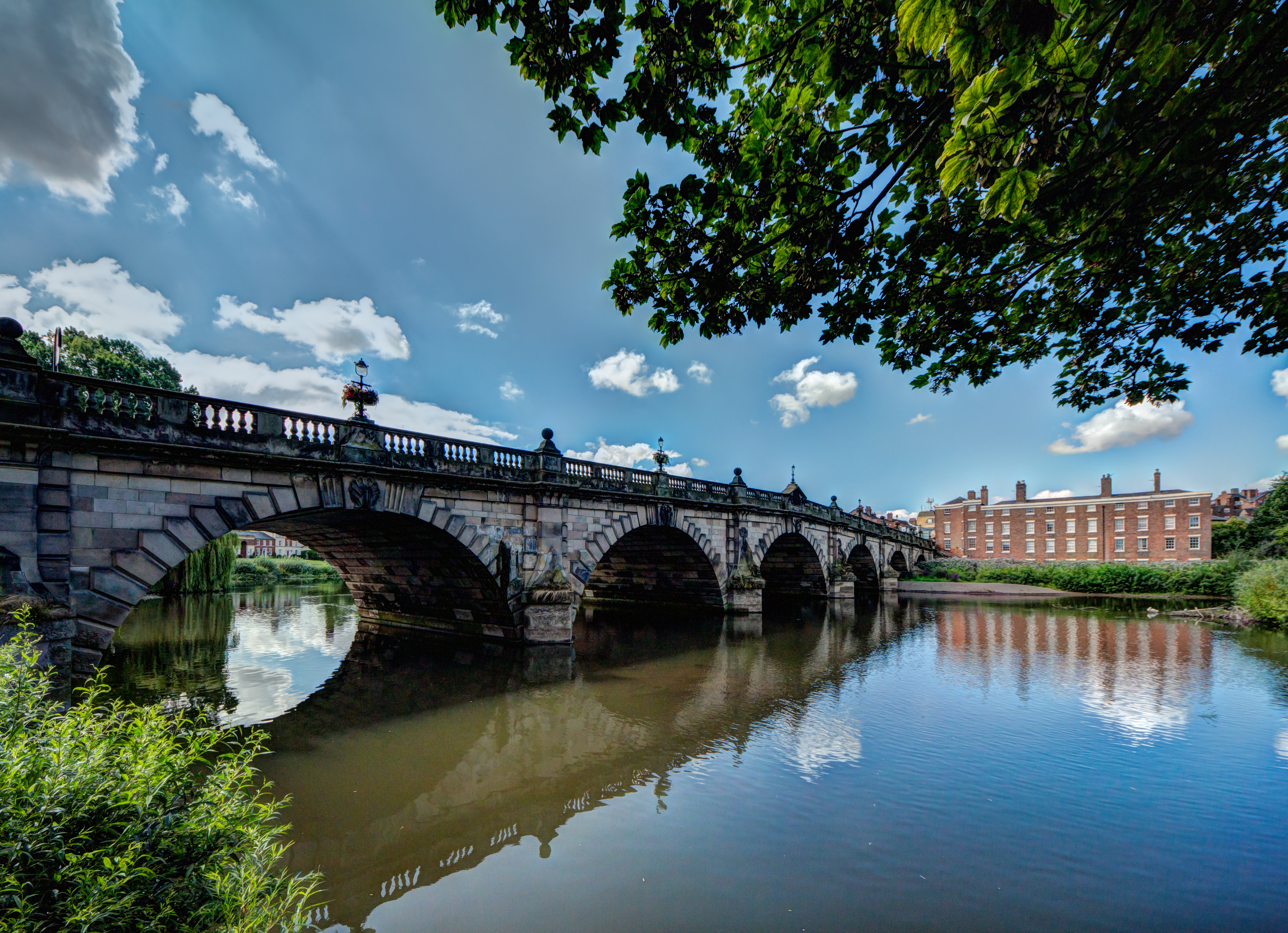
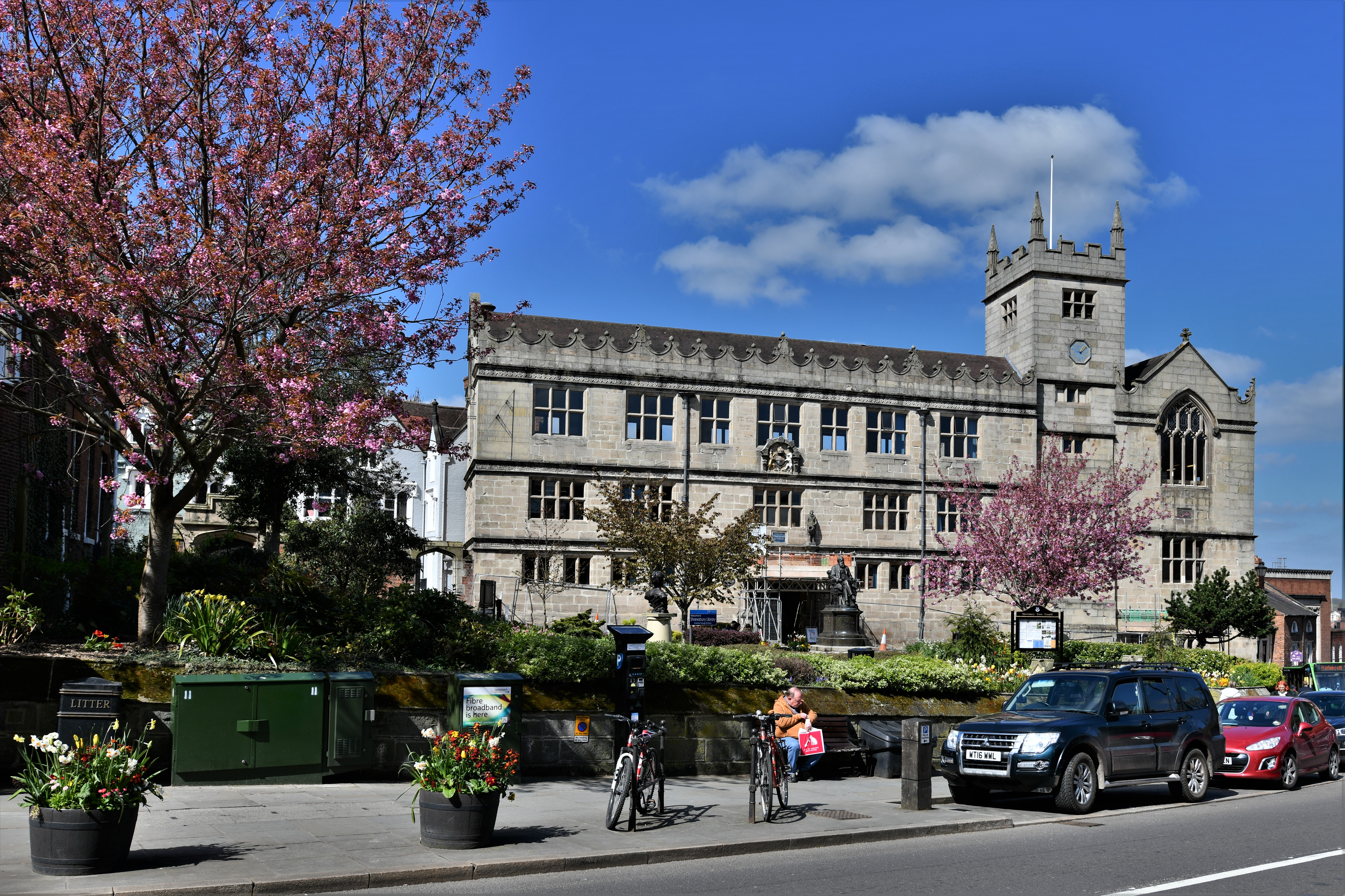
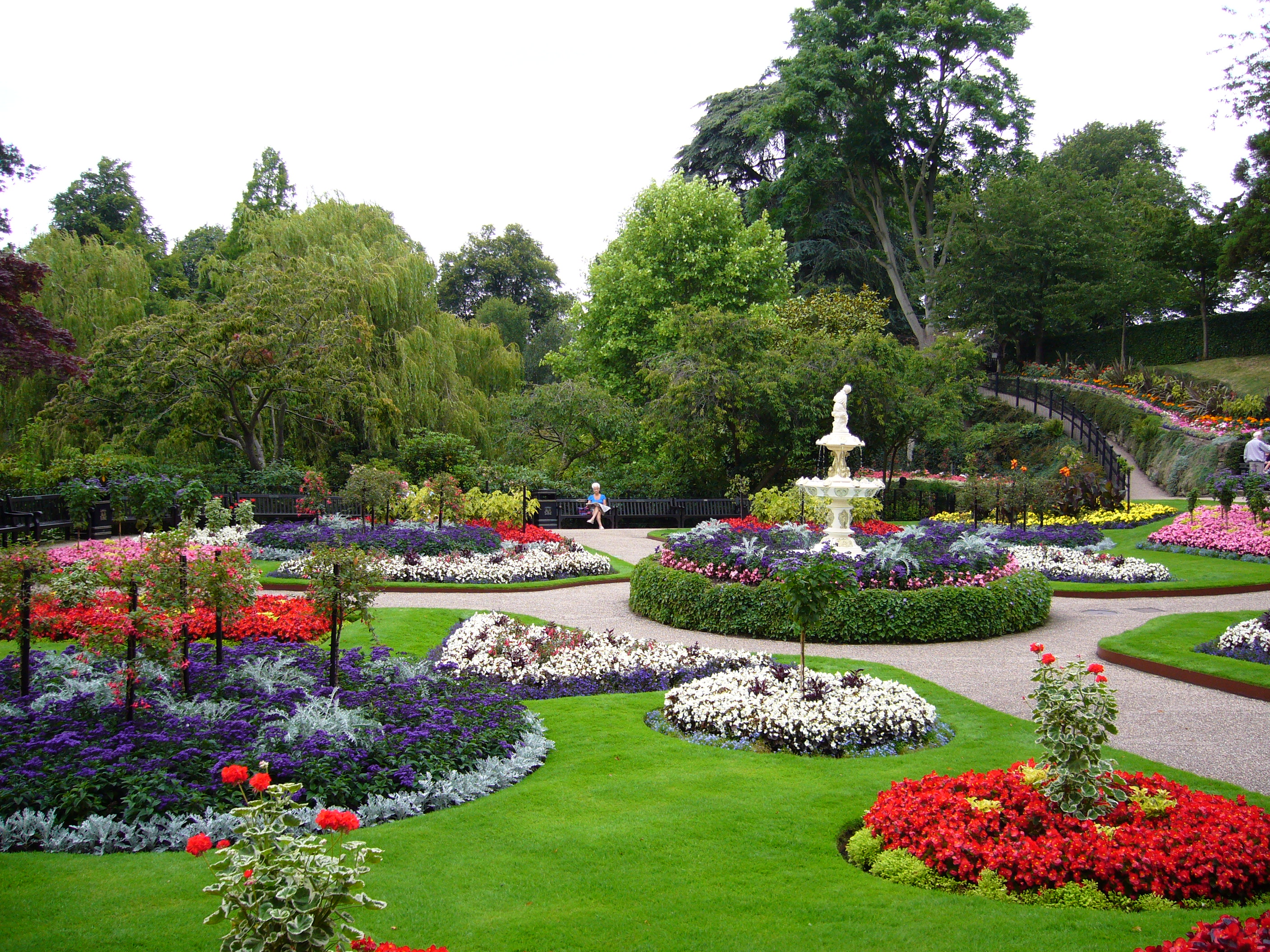
- Old Market Hall River Severn Castle English Bridge The Library The Quarry

- Location within Shropshire
- Interactive map of Shrewsbury
- Population: 76,782 (2021 Census)
- Demonym: Salopian
- OS grid reference: SJ 4915 1253
- Civil parish: Shrewsbury
- Unitary authority: Shropshire
- Ceremonial county: Shropshire
- Region: West Midlands
- Country: England
- Sovereign state: United Kingdom
- Areas of the town: List: Battlefield; Bicton; Bowbrook; Cherry Orchard; Ditherington; Frankwell; Kingsland; Meole Brace; Monkmoor; Mountfields; Nobold; Shelton; Sundorne; Sutton; Sutton Farm; Sweet Lake; Town Centre; Underdale
- Post town: SHREWSBURY
- Postcode district: SY1 SY2 SY3
- Dialling code: 01743
- Police: West Mercia
- Fire: Shropshire
- Ambulance: West Midlands
- UK Parliament: Shrewsbury

Shrewsbury (/ˈʃroʊzbri/ SHROHZ-bree, also /ˈʃruːz-/ SHROOZ-) is a market town and civil parish in Shropshire, England. It is sited on the River Severn, 33 miles (53 km) northwest of Wolverhampton, 15 miles (24 km) west of Telford, 31 miles (50 km) southeast of Wrexham and 53 miles (85 km) north of Hereford. At the 2021 census, the parish had a population of 76,782. It is the county town of the ceremonial county of Shropshire.

Shrewsbury has Anglo-Saxon roots and institutions whose foundations, dating from that time, represent a cultural continuity possibly going back as far as the 8th century. The centre has a largely undisturbed medieval street plan and over 660 listed buildings, including several examples of timber framing from the 15th and 16th centuries. Shrewsbury Castle, a red sandstone fortification, and Shrewsbury Abbey, were founded in 1074 and 1083 respectively by the Norman Earl of Shrewsbury, Roger de Montgomery. The town is the birthplace of the naturalist Charles Darwin. It has had a role in nurturing aspects of English culture, including drama, ballet, dance and pantomime.

Located 9 miles (14 km) east of the England–Wales border, Shrewsbury serves as the commercial centre for Shropshire and parts of mid-Wales, with a retail output of over £299 million per year and light industry and distribution centres, such as Battlefield Enterprise Park, on the outskirts. The A5 and A49 trunk roads come together as the town's by-pass and five railway lines meet at Shrewsbury railway station.

== Toponymy ==
The name comes from Old English Scrobbesburh (dative Scrobbesbyrig), meaning either "Scrobb's fort" or "the fortified place of the scrubland". The surrounding county was known as Scrobbesbyrigscir or simply Scrobscir, a name that later became Shropshire. The Normans, who had trouble pronouncing the initial consonant cluster, referred to the town as Salopesberie and the county as Salopescira, hence the abbreviation Salop.

The town's name can be pronounced as either /ˈʃroʊzbəri/ (SHROHZ-bər-ee) or /ˈʃruːzbəri/ (SHROOZ-bər-ee), the correct pronunciation being a matter of longstanding debate.

== History ==
=== Prehistory ===
Evidence of Neolithic occupation of a religious form dating back before 2,000 BC, was discovered in 2017 in the grounds of the medieval Church of the Holy Fathers in Sutton Farm, making it Britain's oldest place of worship. An Early Bronze Age urned burial was excavated at Crowmeole in 2015. An Iron Age double ring ditch has been excavated at Meole Brace. Amongst other finds, parts of an Iron Age sword and scabbard were recovered.

=== Roman and Saxon ===
At Meole Brace, an extensive roadside settlement along the line of the Roman military road connecting Viroconium Cornoviorum and Caersws was uncovered, with evidence of trading of amphorae and mortaria. A major discovery was the finding of the Shrewsbury Hoard of more than 9000 Roman coins in a field near the town in 2009.

It is claimed that Pengwern, sometime capital of the Kingdom of Powys (itself established by the 440s), was at Shrewsbury, and it has been said in Parliament that the town was founded by the late 600s, the basis for this likely the Anglo-Saxon Chronicle's account of the 584 battle at Fethanleag, where Ceawlin defeated the Britons and captured numerous settlements including possibly Uriconium, which sets the historical context for the first likely textual mention of Shrewsbury in the poetry of the British prince Llywarch Hen, who mourned the destruction of Uriconium. Llywarch Hen's presence at the court of Prince Cynddylan at Pengwern, understood as the British name for Shrewsbury, implies the town's existence during this period. There is consistent tradition that the town was "founded in the 5th century, on occasion of the decay of the Roman Uriconium." Historian John Wacher suggests that Shrewsbury may have been refortified by refugees fleeing an outbreak of a plague in Viroconium around this time. Context for the nature of early Medieval period life in the wider district can be found in archaeological evidence on the nearby Attingham estate, where foundations of two rare 25m-long Anglo-Saxon timber halls dating to around 650 AD have been discovered, highlighting a significant and well-resourced Anglo-Saxon community in the region.

The first attested association of Pengwern with Shrewsbury is mentioned by Giraldus Cambrensis in the 12th century. Alternative suggestions as to the location of Pengwern include Whittington Castle near Oswestry, and Berth, a hillfort near Baschurch. The Historia Divae Monacellae, composed in the 14th or 15th century, says that Brochwel Ysgithrog, the 6th-century king of Powis, had a palace at Shrewsbury that became the site of the foundation of St Chad.

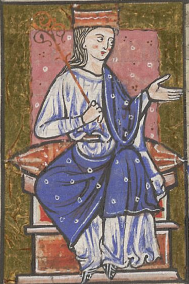
Æthelflæd, 'Lady of the Mercians'

In the late 8th century, it is said that Offa took the town for the Mercians in 778, (Note: the Annales Cambriae merely refers to "The devastation of the South Britons by Offa." in that year.) and he is associated by some sources with establishing the town's first church and dedicating it to St Chad. If so, then there may have been an ecclesiastical foundation in the town within a century of the death of Chad of Mercia.

Shrewsbury remained part of the Mercian kingdom until its incorporation into the larger realm of England under Egbert in the first half of the ninth century. During the subsequent Saxon period, historical records of the town are scarce.

Early in the tenth century Athelstan made a law to secure uniformity of coinage throughout his dominion, and this enactment specified the number of moneyers in the principal towns. Shrewsbury possessed one such moneyer, proving that while it reached a certain point of importance it did not rank among towns of the first class (this number was later raised to three in the reign of Edward the Confessor; and all through the period from Athelstan to Henry III, the Shrewsbury mint was busy).

Viking raiders from the north were reaching as far south as Bridgnorth by 910, and in 914, (Note: Tim Clarkson's biography has a detailed discussion of Æthelflæd' burhs.) Æthelflæd, daughter of Alfred the Great and known as the Lady of the Mercians, fortified Shrewsbury, along with Hereford and two other fortresses, at Scergeat (a currently unknown location) and Weardbyrig (thought to be Whitchurch, which would make sense given the strategic importance of the Roman Road link via the Via Devana). Recent excavations at Shrewsbury Castle, funded by the Castle Studies Trust, revealed a massive defensive ditch surrounding the Norman motte and evidence of fortified presence on the castle site, predating the Norman invasion.

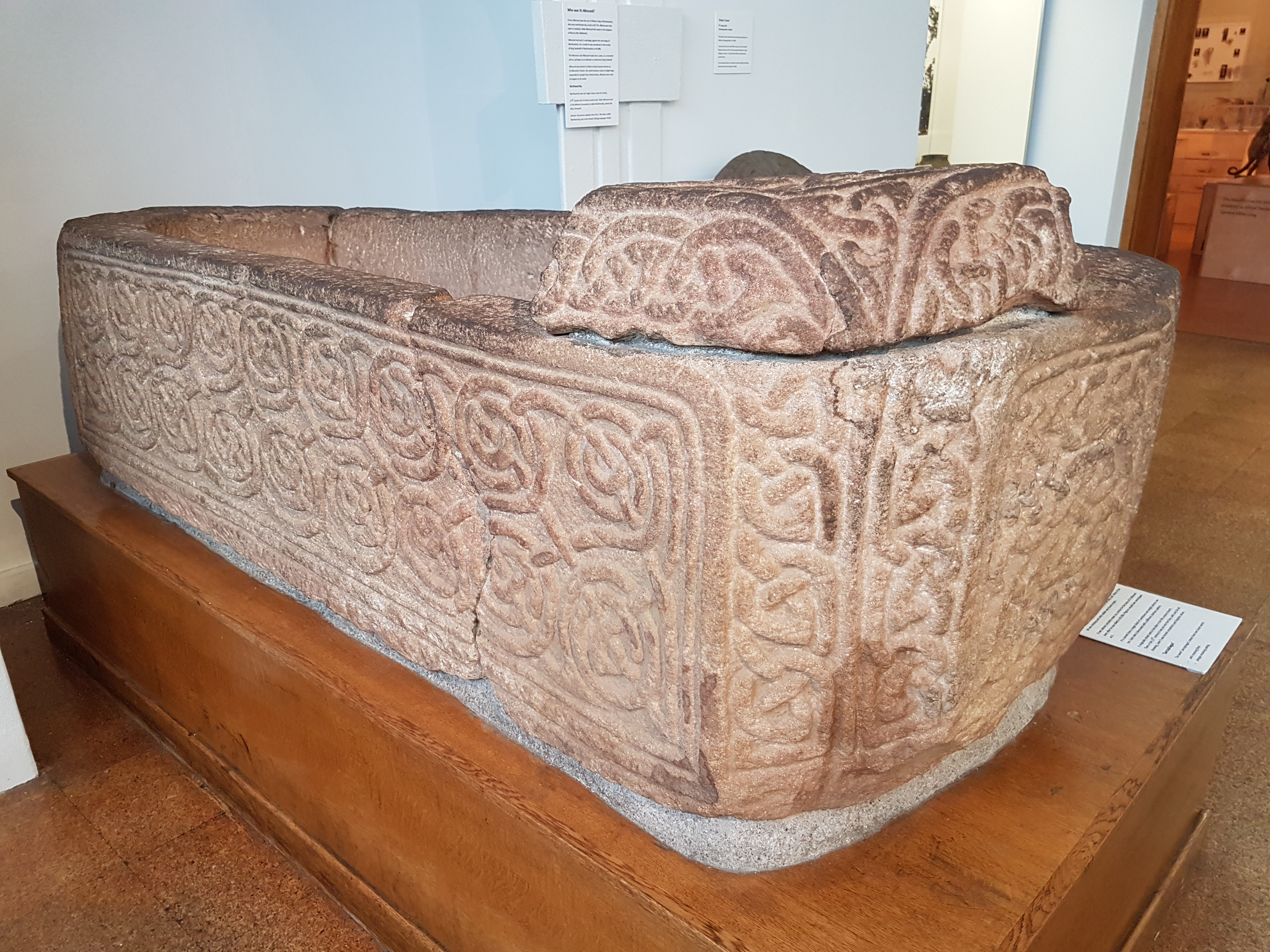
St Alkmund's sarcophagus, now at Derby Museum and Art Gallery, almost certainly made as a shrine for the body of St. Alkmund soon after he was killed in AD 800. Pilgrims would have worshipped at it. The relics were in Shrewsbury from the early 900s CE to about 1145.

Some time before 918, the relics of St Alkmund were translated to Shrewsbury and back to Shropshire from Derby, this was probably the work of Æthelflæd. This return to Shropshire move followed Alkmund's initial burial in Shropshire after his death in 800.

Later, King Edgar (957–75) established a collegiate church with a dean and 10 prebendaries at St Alkmund's Church, it was a Royal peculiar, and subsequently, it became the property of Lilleshall Abbey in about 1145, when the relics were retranslated back to Derby.

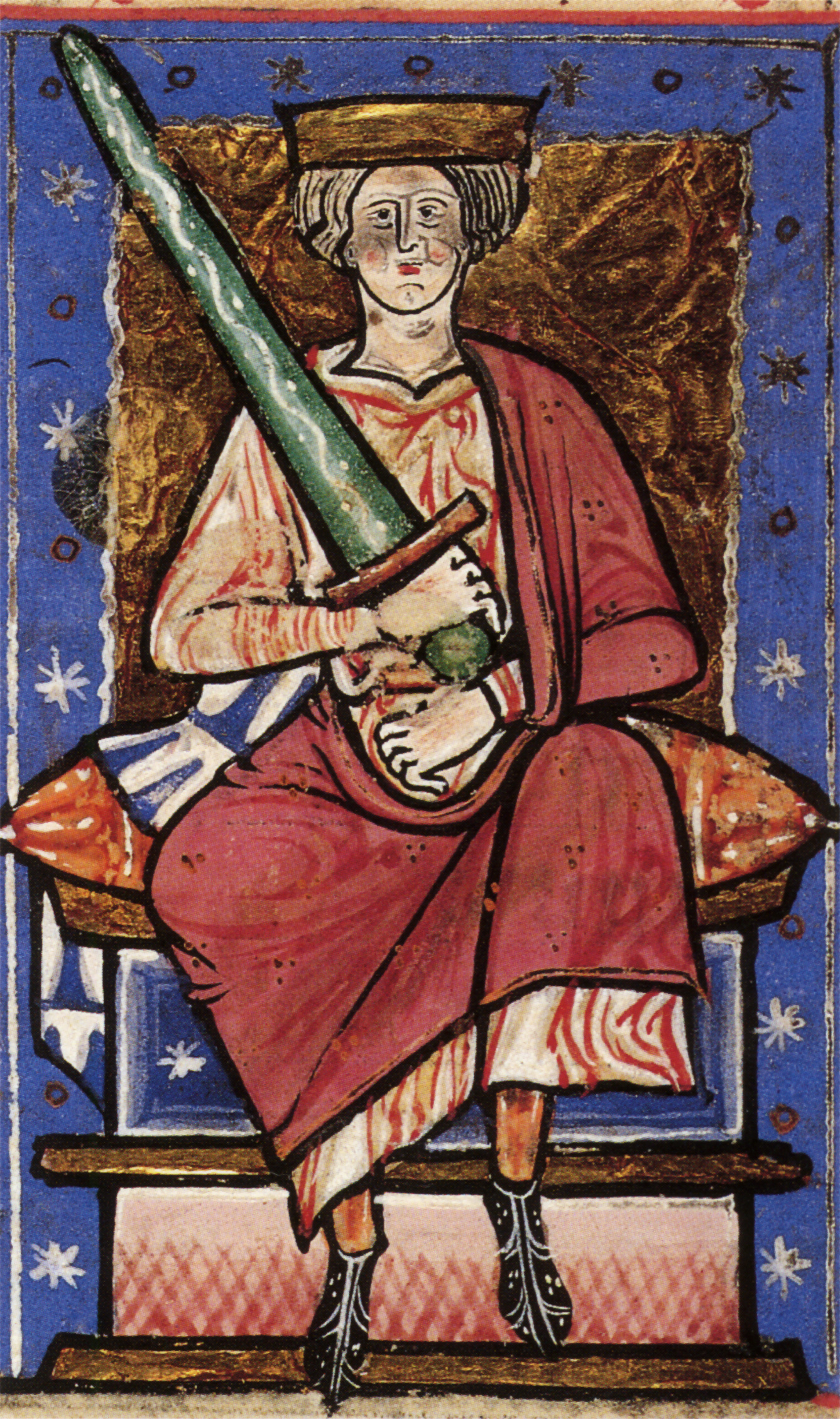
Traditional accounts recount that during the devastating Danish invasion of 1006, King Æthelred II chose to withdraw to his royal seat in Shrewsbury.

Following Æthelflæd's fortification of Shrewsbury, the town largely avoided the devastating wave of the Danish invasions that impacted other parts of England. This immunity, which extended across Shropshire, is notable despite evidence of Danish ships on the River Severn (suggested by the name Danesford near Bridgnorth) and a recorded Danish defeat at Buttington (near Welshpool) in 894. The protection of the region is mainly attributed to Æthelred, the ealdorman of Mercia appointed by Alfred, and Æthelflæd herself. Subsequently, during the tenth century, Shrewsbury appears to have experienced a period of relative stability. An historical narrative, well established in the nineteenth century, asserts that during the devastating Danish invasion of 1006, Æthelred the Unready withdrew to his royal seat in Shrewsbury. In this account, the King experienced "great perplexity," reflecting the collapse of the national defense. This strategic withdrawal preceded the disastrous decision to pay the immense sum of £30,000 Danegeld in 1007 to halt the Danish advance. (Note: Stenton's Anglo-Saxon England in the Oxford History of England, makes no mention of Æthelred retreating to Shrewsbury at this time.)

=== Norman ===
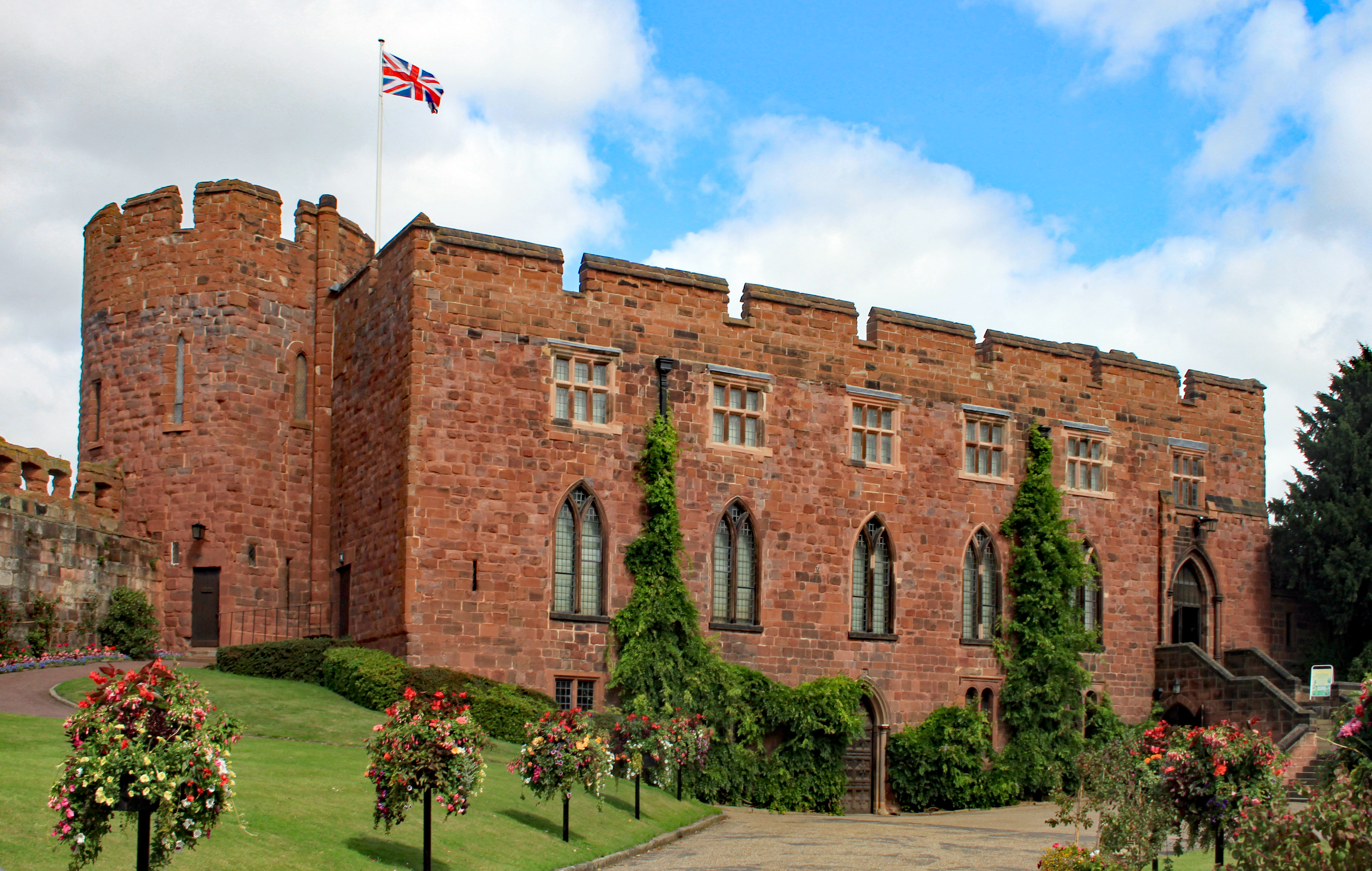
Shrewsbury Castle, built at around 1074 by Roger de Montgomery

Roger de Montgomery was given the town as a gift from William the Conqueror and was created Earl of Shrewsbury. He built at Shrewsbury Castle at around 1074, though there is evidence the location may have been a fortified site in the time of the Anglo-Saxons. This construction work destroyed 51 properties, and it is thought much of this hard labour was forced on local workers.

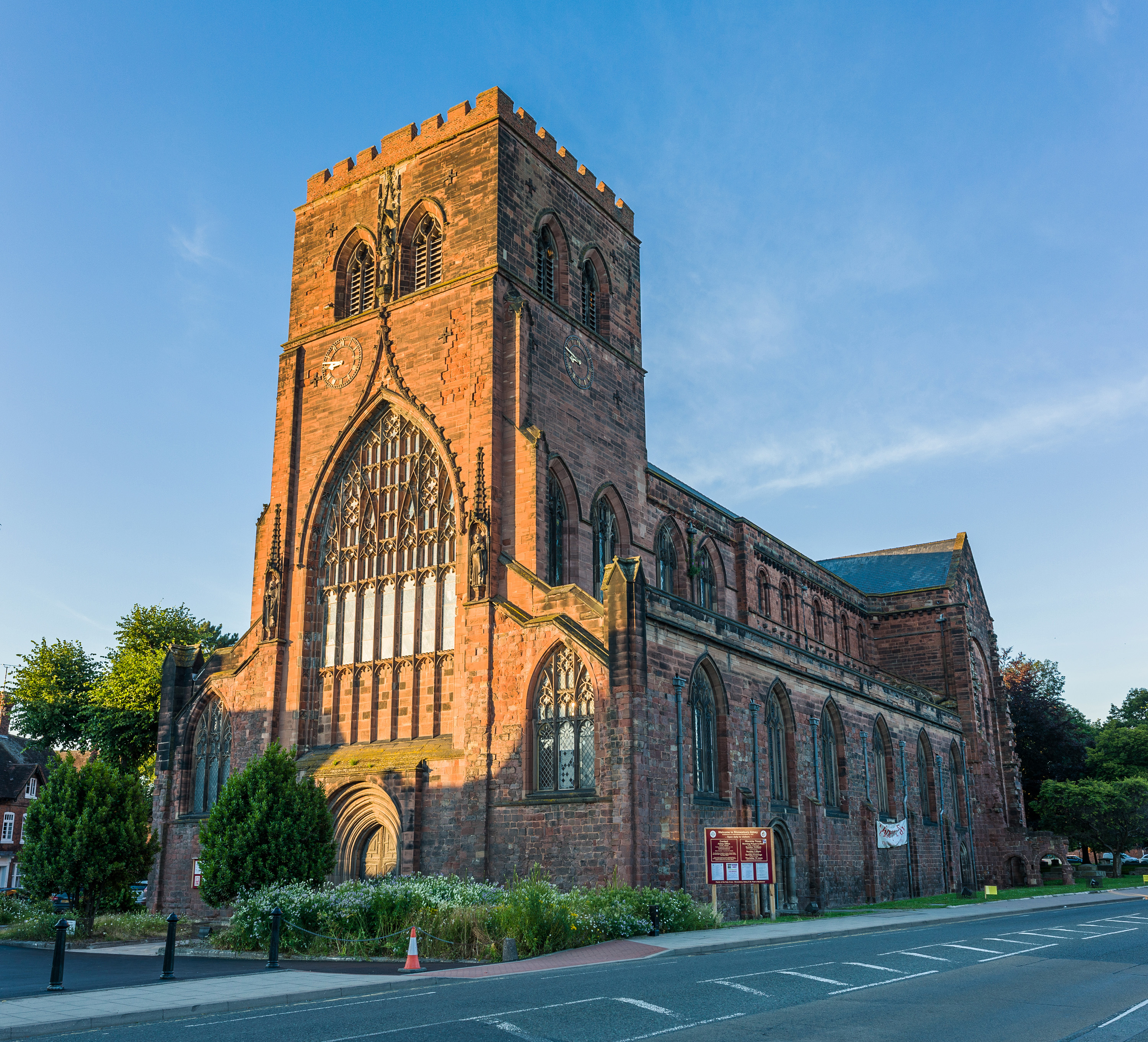
Shrewsbury Abbey, founded 1083

He also founded Shrewsbury Abbey as a Benedictine monastery in 1083.

The town's position just off Watling Street placed it within the Forest of Arden, a thickly wooded area, unpenetrated by Roman roads and somewhat dangerous in medieval times, so that travellers would pray at Coughton before entering.

In 1102, Robert of Bellême, 3rd Earl of Shrewsbury was deposed and the title forfeited, as a consequence of him rebelling against Henry I and joining the Duke of Normandy's invasion of England in 1101. William Pantulf, Lord of Wem, assisted Henry in putting down the rebellion. To deal with the thickly wooded local forests, ideal for the concealment of archers, Pantulf brought in 6,000 foot soldiers to cut down trees and open up the roads. Henry subsequently took the government of the town into his own hands and in 1116 the nobility of England did homage to William Ætheling, Henry's son, at Shrewsbury, and swore allegiance to his father. The early death of William Ætheling without issue led to the succession crisis, known in history as the Anarchy, and during this period, in 1138, King Stephen successfully besieged the town's castle held by William FitzAlan for the Empress Maud.

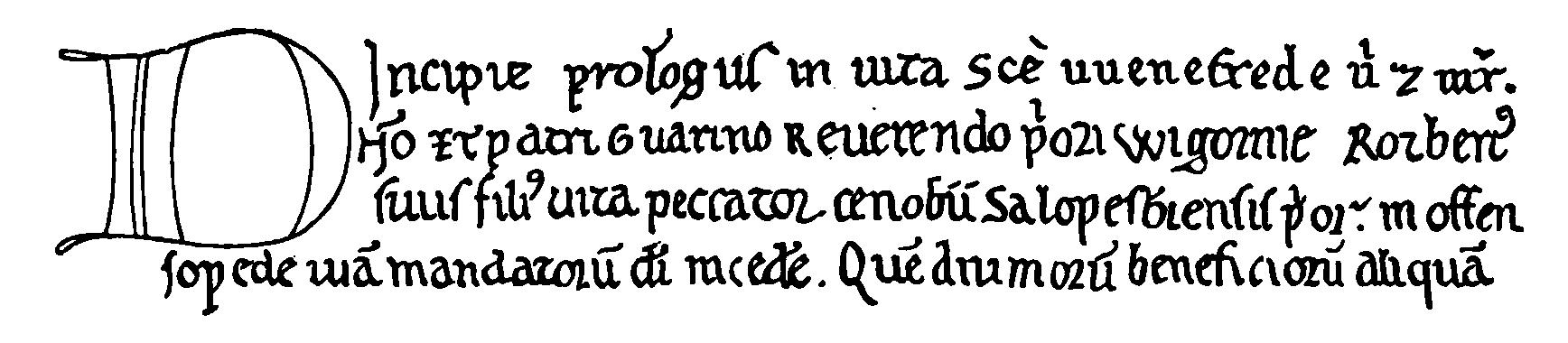
Part of the prologue of a life of St Winifred by Robert of Shrewsbury (Bodleian Mss. Laud c.94.)

In 1138, the relics of St Winifred were brought to Shrewsbury from Gwytheryn, following their purchase by the Abbot of Shrewsbury, the abbey being ready for consecration but having no relics prior to that time. The popularity of St Winifred grew in the 14th and 15th centuries and a new shrine for her relics was built in the late 1300s. Around this time the abbey illegally acquired the relics of St Beuno, uncle of St Winifred, by stealing them. As a result, the abbey was fined but allowed to keep the relics.

=== Mediaeval ===
From 1155, during the reign of Henry II, there was a leper hospital dedicated to St Giles and associated with Shrewsbury Abbey. From the 1220s, there was also a general hospital dedicated to St John the Baptist.

In January 1234, Prince Llywelyn ab Iorwerth of Wales and Richard Marshal, 3rd Earl of Pembroke burned down the town and laid siege to its castle.

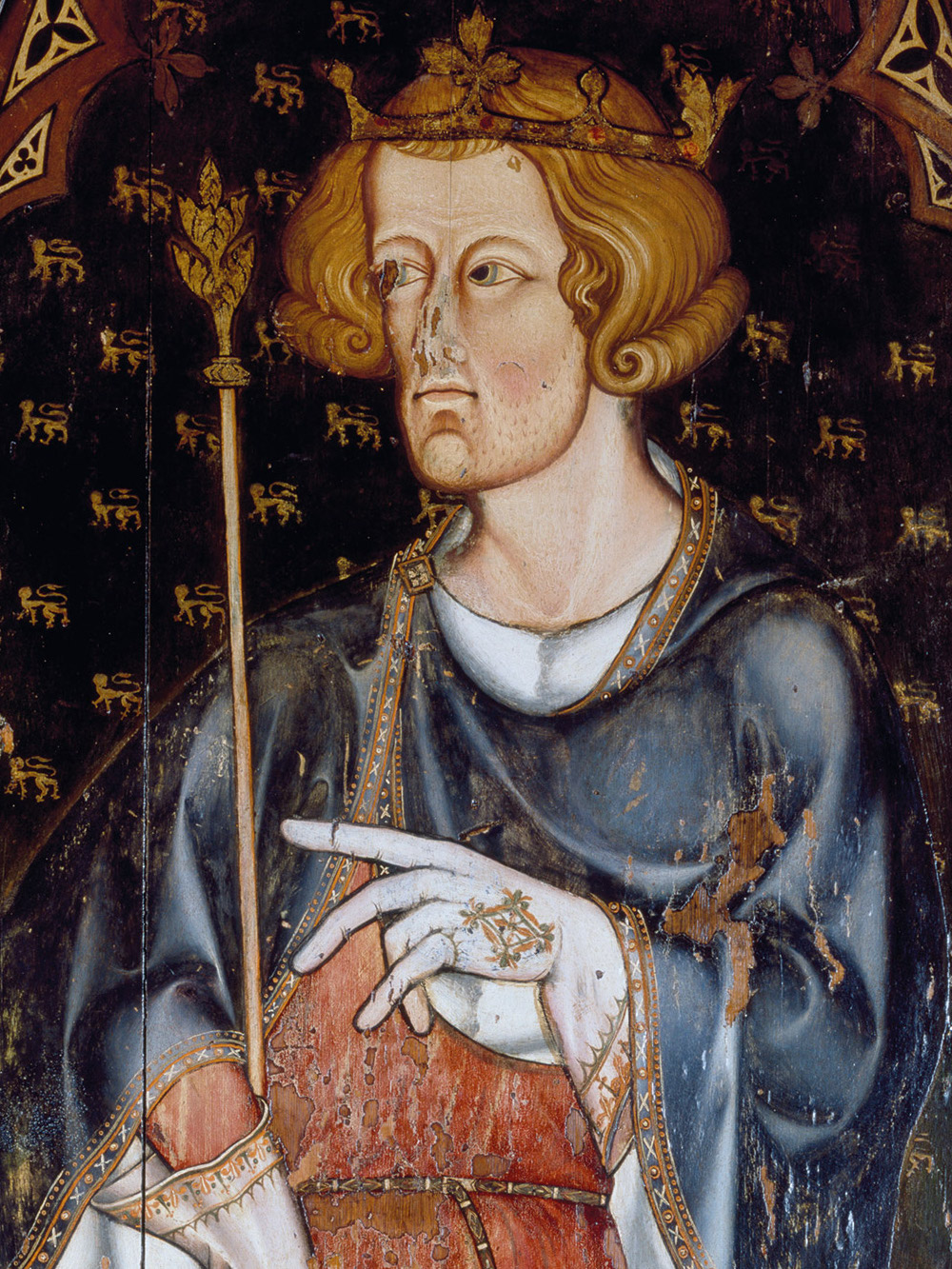
Edward I summoned a Parliament to Shrewsbury

In 1283, Edward I (whose military campaigns in Wales frequently brought him to Shropshire) summoned a parliament in Shrewsbury, later adjourned to Acton Burnell, to try and condemn Dafydd ap Gruffydd, last of the native Princes of Wales, to execution by hanging, drawing and quartering within the town after Dafydd was captured, ending his rebellion against the king. It is thought this parliament met in the Abbey. This is often considered to be the first Parliament at which commoners were represented.

Shrewsbury was devastated by the Black Death, which, records suggest, arrived in the spring of 1349. Examining the number of local church benefices falling vacant due to death, 1349 alone saw twice as many vacancies as the previous ten years combined, suggesting a high death toll in Shrewsbury.

"The Great Fire of Shrewsbury" took place in 1394: St Chad's church was consumed by an accidental fire, which spread to a great portion of the town, then chiefly consisting of timber houses with thatched roofs. The damage was so considerable that Richard II remitted the town's taxes for three years towards the repairs.

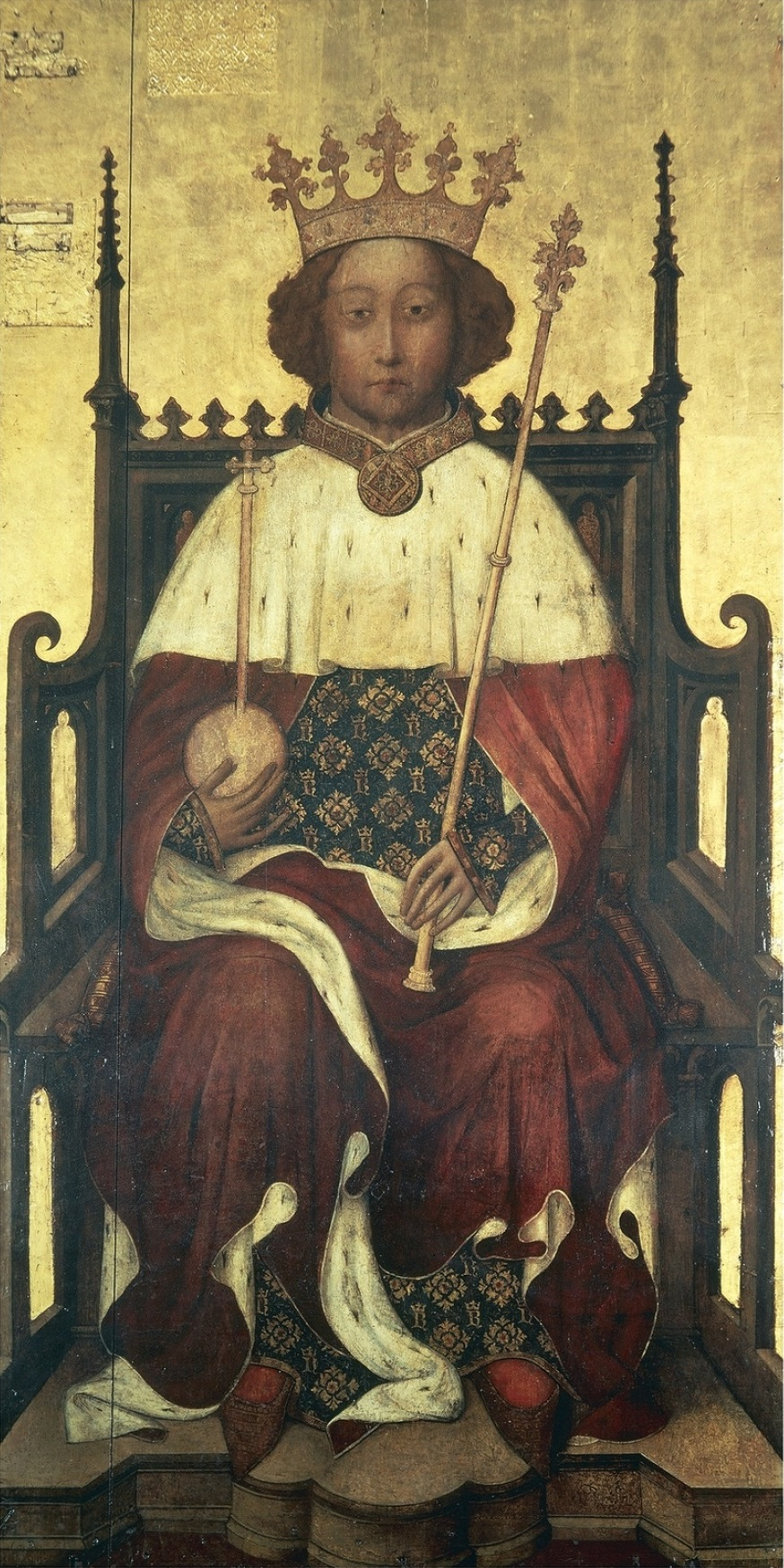
Richard II also summoned a Parliament in the town

In 1398, Richard II summoned a Great Parliament in the town, which is believed to have met in the Abbey; dubbed the "Revenge Parliament," it originally met in Westminster but was prorogued to Shrewsbury (he publicly proclaimed it an act of affection for the people of Shropshire). It was a turning point in Richard II's reign, and sowed the seeds of his eventual downfall. This national drama played out against a backdrop of local controversy, as Shrewsbury itself grappled with its own internal power struggles and grievances against its ruling elite.

In 1403, the Battle of Shrewsbury was fought at Battlefield, a few miles north of the town centre, between King Henry IV and Henry Percy (Hotspur), with the king emerging victorious. Hotspur's body was taken by Thomas Neville, to Whitchurch, for burial. However, when rumours circulated that Percy was still alive, the king "had the corpse exhumed and displayed it, propped upright between two millstones, in the market place at Shrewsbury". That being done, Percy was subjected to posthumous execution.

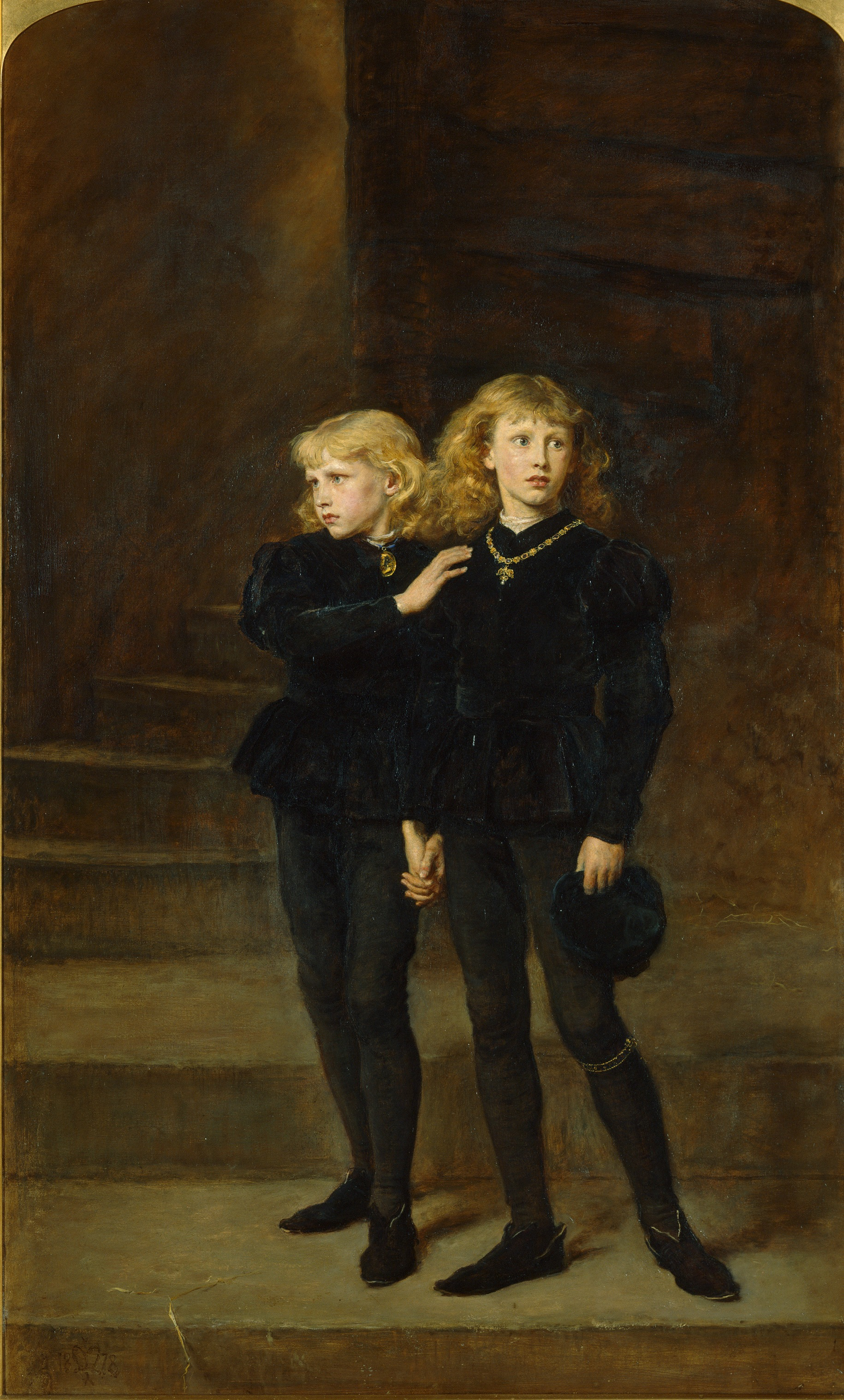
The Two Princes Edward and Richard in the Tower, 1483 by Sir John Everett Millais

One of the Princes in the Tower, Richard of Shrewsbury, was born in the town around 17 August 1473, the second son of King Edward IV of England and Elizabeth Woodville. In 1480, Edward V, then Prince of Wales (and the other prince of the Princes in the Tower), was resident in Shrewsbury. On 11 May Edward V confirmed the composition of the town's Mercer's Company, which had merged with the guilds of the Ironmongers and Goldsmiths. This fraternity were patrons of the Altar of St Michael in St Chad's Church and they kept a Mercers Hall on the site of the Sextry of Old St Chads.

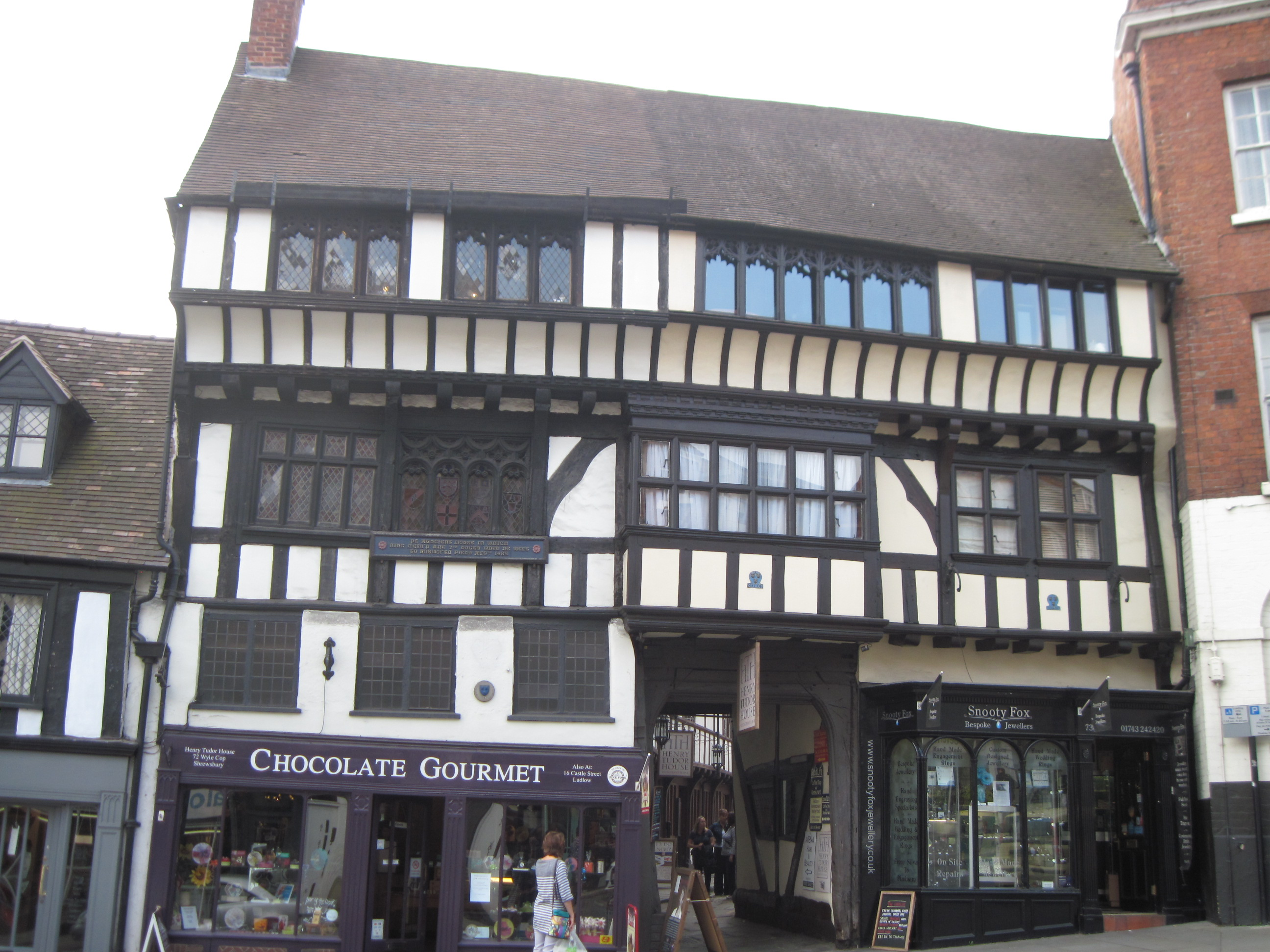
The building Henry Tudor stayed in before the Battle of Bosworth

In 1485, ahead of the Battle of Bosworth Field, Henry Tudor, while not yet king, marched his forces on a route that lay through Shrewsbury. He was initially denied access to the town, but on intervention by a member of the Stanley family he was admitted. Thomas Mytton, the Bailiff of the town, a supporter of Richard III, had vowed that the only way he would get through was "over his dead body". Thomas then lay down and allowed Henry to step over him, to free himself from his oath. Henry was accommodated in the building now known as Henry Tudor House on Wyle Cop.

In 1490, Henry VII, accompanied by his queen and his son, Prince Arthur, celebrated the feast of St George in the town. The town is recorded as having entertained Henry again in 1496, with attendants lodged in the Sextry of Old St Chads; more generally it is said of Henry VII's relations with the town that:

The intercourse which had begun thus favourably was kept up in after years by Henry, who, with his queen and son, frequently visited this town, upon which occasions they were feasted by the Bailiffs in a most royal and hospitable manner.

=== Reformation ===
Shrewsbury's monastic institutions were disbanded with the Dissolution of the Monasteries and the Abbey was closed in 1540. Henry VIII intended to make Shrewsbury one of his 13 new bishoprics (serving Shropshire and Staffordshire) and hence a cathedral city, after the formation of the Church of England but the citizens of the town declined the offer, which is the point of origin of the term "Proud Salopians": the town leadership preferring to be the most senior town in the country and not the most junior city. (Note: This story is also attributed to Charles II)

As a consequence of the dissolution, the monastic hospitals were closed and the incomes from their endowments were transferred to secular owners. St Giles's leper hospital passed to the Prince family, who were succeeded by their descendants the Earls of Tankerville. St John the Baptist hospital passed to the Wood family and became almshouses. At this time the shrine and relics of St Winifred were destroyed.

=== Council of Wales and the Marches ===
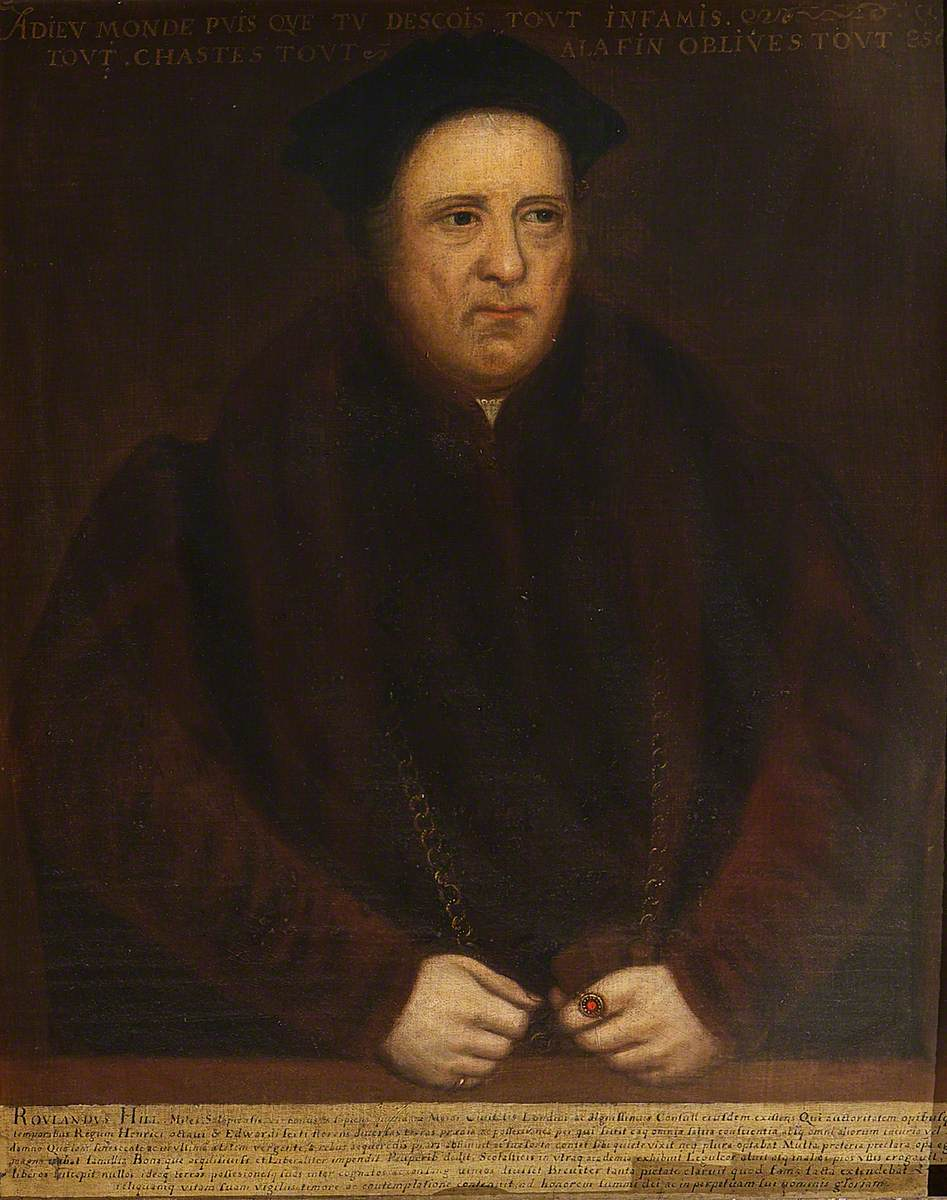
Sir Rowland Hill

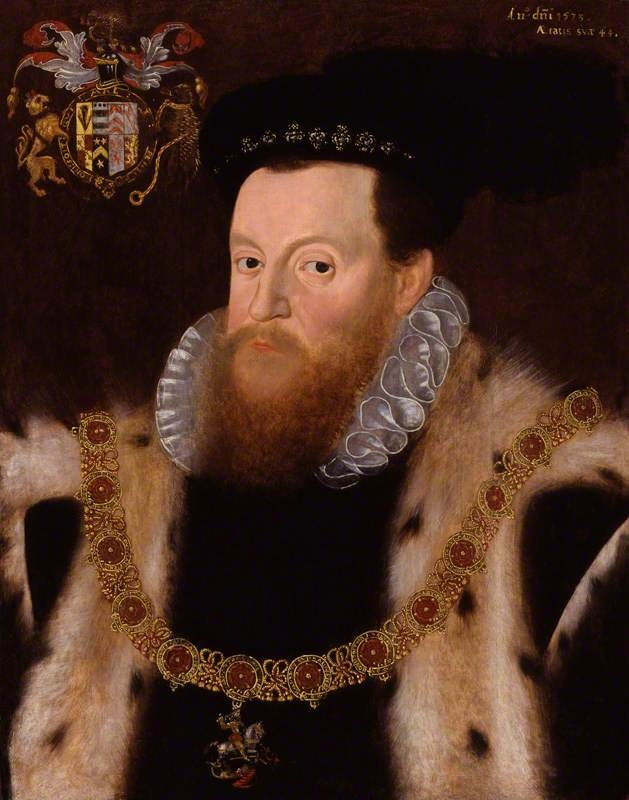
Sir Henry Sidney

Principal members of the Council of the Marches

The Council of Wales and the Marches was established during the 1470s by Edward IV with a headquarters in the town. Its buildings partly survive near the castle and were later adapted to be an episcopal palace. The council also met at Ludlow Castle.

Members of this council included John Dudley, Earl of Warwick; Sir Henry Sidney; William Herbert, 1st Earl of Pembroke; and Sir Rowland Hill, publisher of the Geneva Bible and potential inspiration for a hero in Shakespeare's As You Like It.

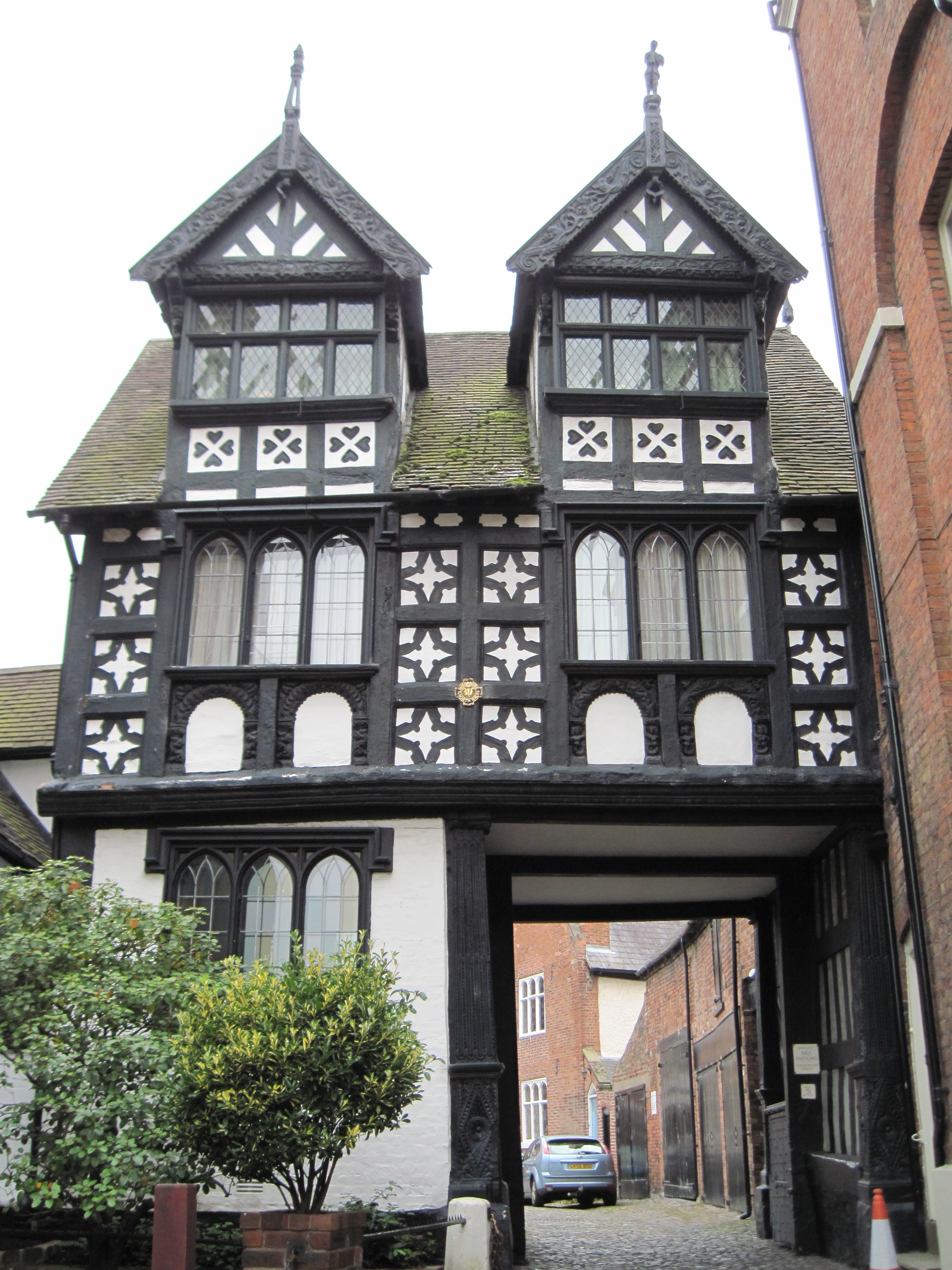
Gate house of the council headquarters in the town

Its functions were interpreted widely. It was to hear all suits, civil and criminal, which were brought by individuals too poor to sue at common law; it was to try all cases of murder, felony, piracy, wrecking and such crimes as were likely to disturb the peace; it was to investigate charges of misgovernment by officials and the false verdicts of juries; it was to enforce the laws against livery and maintenance, to punish rumour mongers and adulterers, and to deal with disputes concerning enclosures, villein service and manorial questions; it heard appeals from the common law courts; and it was responsible for administering the legislation dealing with religion. According to historian John Davies, at its peak in the mid-16th century, the Council:

represented a remarkable experiment in regional government. It administered the law cheaply and rapidly; it dealt with up to twenty cases a day and George Owen stated that the 'oppressed poor' flocked to it.

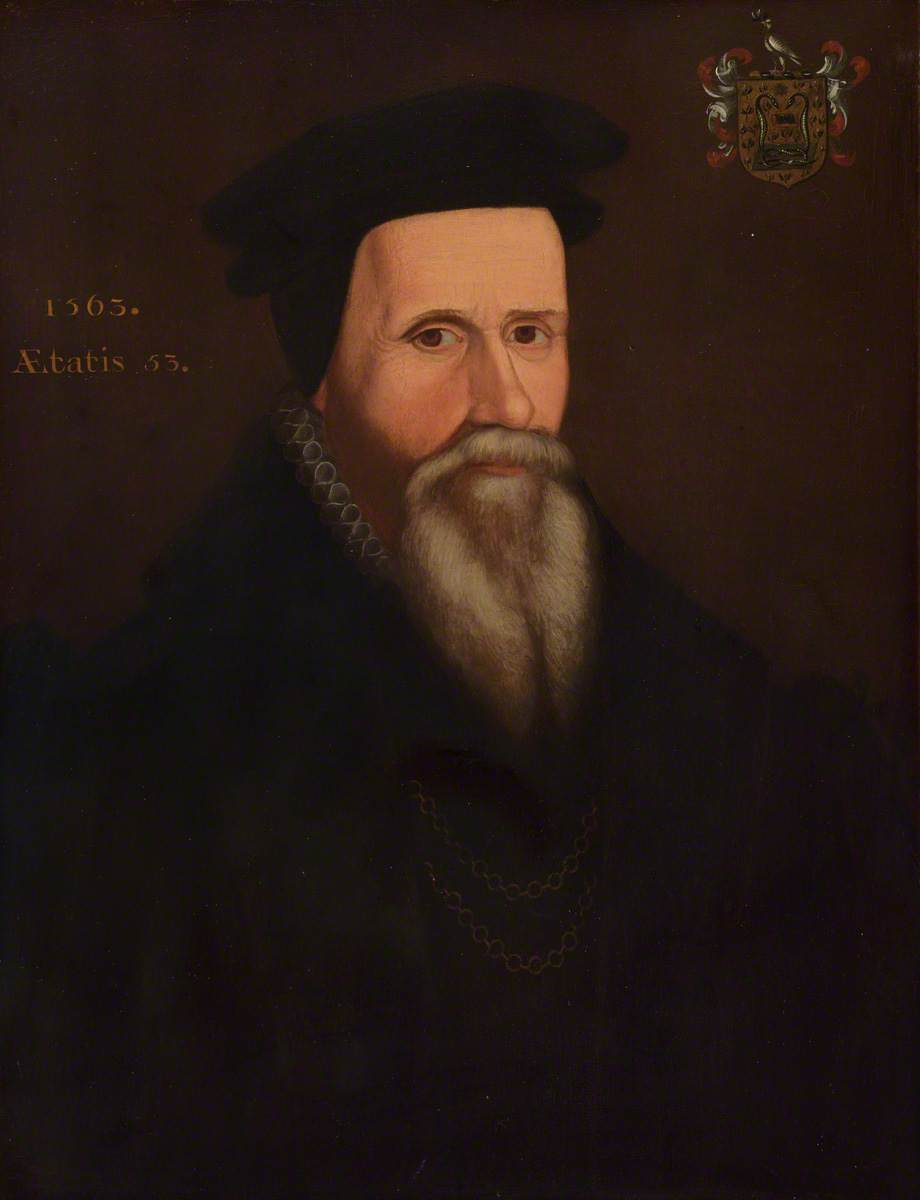
Dr John Caius

In 1551, there was a notable outbreak of sweating sickness in the town. Dr John Caius visited the town to attend to this at the command of the council. The following year, after his return to London, Caius published A Boke or Counseill Against the Disease Commonly Called the Sweate, or Sweatyng Sicknesse. The president of the council was the dedicatee of the book, and the dedicatory epistle explains his appointment. This text became the main source of knowledge of this disease, now understood to be influenza.

In 1581, Sir Henry Sidney celebrated the feast of St George, on 23 April, in this town, with great splendour: a solemn procession went from the Council House to St Chad's Church, whose choir was fitted up in imitation of St George's Chapel, Windsor Castle, with the stalls decorated with the arms of the Knights of the Garter; on the conclusion of divine service Sir Henry devoted the afternoon to feasting the burgesses.

=== Early Modern ===
Shrewsbury thrived throughout the 16th and 17th centuries, a period when the town was at the height of its commercial importance. This success was largely due to the town's location, which allowed it to control the Welsh wool trade, a major industry at the time, with the rest of Britain and Europe, with the River Severn and Watling Street acting as trading routes. This trade was dominated by the Shrewsbury Drapers Company for many years. As a result, a number of grand edifices, including the Ireland's Mansion (built 1575) and Draper's Hall (1560), were constructed.

It was in this period that Edward VI gave permission for the foundation of a free school, which was later to become Shrewsbury School. Later, William Camden, in his Britannia (begun 1577), remarked of the town that "Shrewsbury is inhabited both by Welsh and English, who speak each other's language; and among other things greatly to their praise is the grammar school founded by them, the best filled in all England, whose flourishing state is owing to provision made by its head master, the excellent and worthy Thomas Ashton", the school's first head master.

=== Civil War ===
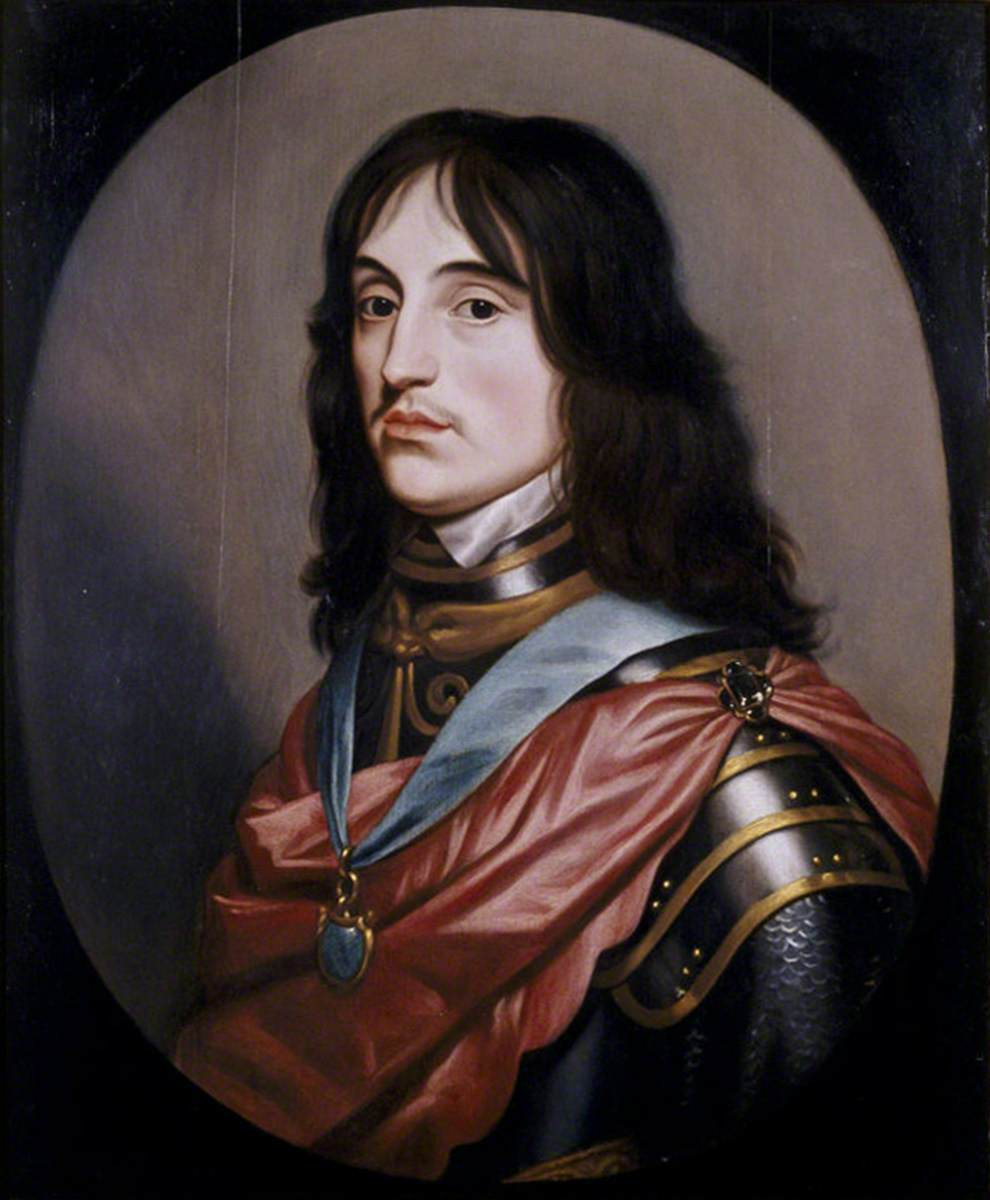
Prince Rupert

During the English Civil War, Shrewsbury was a Royalist stronghold, under the command of Sir Francis Ottley. In the autumn of 1642 Charles I had a temporary base in the town.

Prince Rupert established his headquarters in the town on 18 February 1644, being welcomed by Shrewsbury's aldermen. He was billeted in a building then the home of the family of Thomas Jones in the precincts of what is now the Prince Rupert Hotel.

Shrewsbury only fell to Parliament forces after they were let in by a parliamentarian sympathiser at the St Mary's Water Gate (now also known as Traitor's Gate). After Thomas Mytton captured Shrewsbury in February 1645, in following with the ordnance of no quarter, a dozen Irish prisoners were selected to be killed after picking lots. This prompted Rupert to respond by executing Parliamentarian prisoners in Oswestry.

=== Georgian and Victorian ===
By the 18th century, Shrewsbury had become an important market town and stopping point for stagecoaches travelling between London and Holyhead with passengers on their way to Ireland; this led to the establishment of a number of coaching inns, many of which, such as the Lion Hotel, are extant to this day.

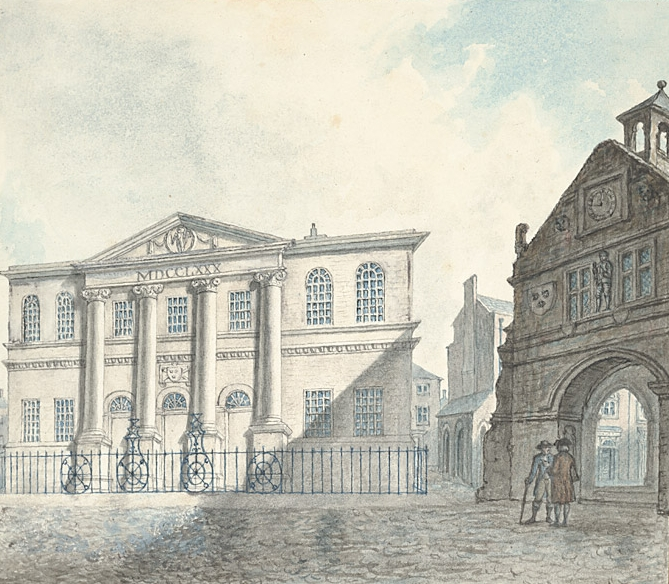
The former Shire Hall (since demolished) and Old Market Hall, 1796

A town hall was built in the Market Place on the site of an ancient guildhall in 1730; it was demolished and a new combined guildhall and shirehall was erected on the site in 1837.

Local soldier and statesman Robert Clive served as the town's mayor in 1762 and was Shrewsbury's MP from 1762 until his death in 1774.

St Chad's Church collapsed in 1788 after attempts to expand the crypt compromised the structural integrity of the tower above. Now known as Old St Chad's, the remains of the church building and its churchyard are on the corner of Princess Street, College Hill and Belmont. A new St Chad's Church was built just four years after the collapse, but as a large neo-classical round church and in a different and more elevated location, at the top of Claremont Hill close to the Quarry.

In the Industrial Revolution the Shrewsbury Canal opened in 1797, initially connecting the town to Trench. By 1835 it had been linked up to the Shropshire Canal and thence to the rest of the canal network.

In the period directly after Napoleon's surrender after the Battle of Waterloo, the town's own 53rd (Shropshire) Regiment of Foot was sent to guard him in his exile on St Helena. A locket containing a lock of the emperor's hair, presented to an officer of the 53rd, remains to this day in the collections of the Soldiers of Shropshire Museum at Shrewsbury Castle.

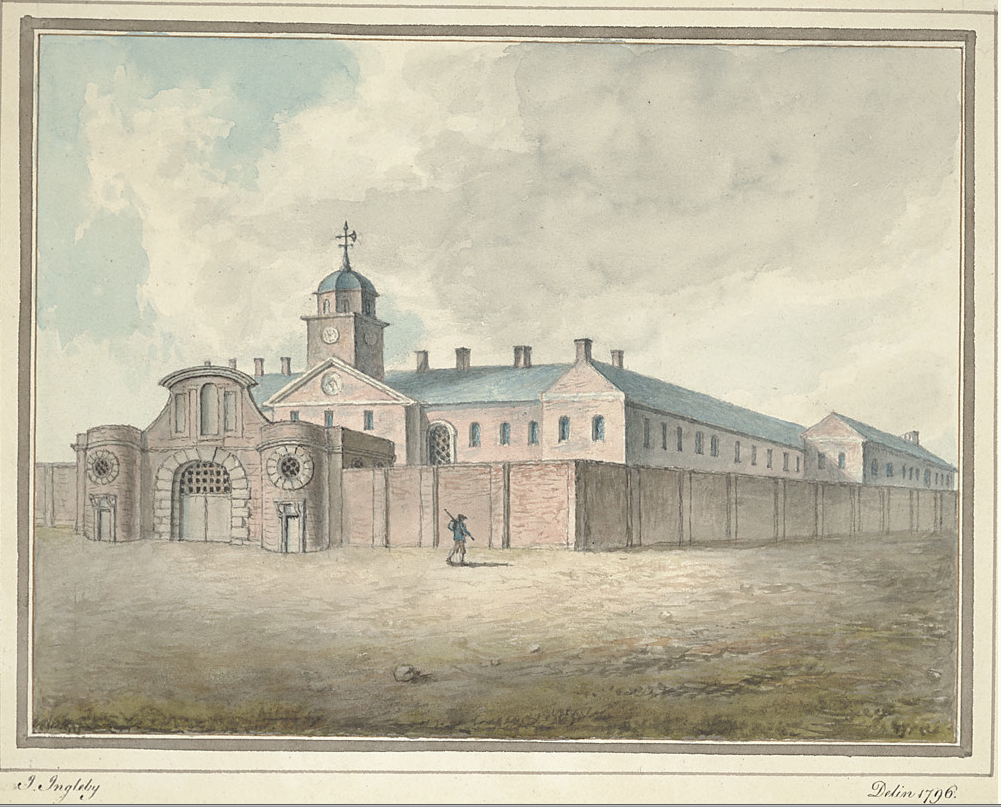
Shrewsbury's Georgian prison

HM Prison Shrewsbury, when new in the Georgian period, was considered a national example of improved conditions and more enlightened penal policy. Times change and a 2005 report on prison population found that it was the most overcrowded in England and Wales, despite a major expansion in Victorian times. The prison, which was also known as the Dana because it was built near the site of the medieval Dana gaol, was closed in 2013 and then sold by the Ministry of Justice to private property developers in 2014.

In 1821, the county purchased a building in College Hill which was adapted to become the judge's lodgings, providing accommodation for the judges and their retinue during their attendance at the Assizes.

=== 20th and 21st centuries ===
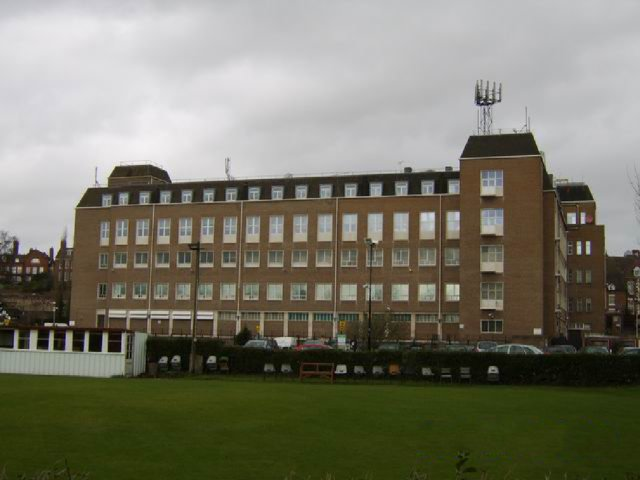
Former BT Telephone Exchange, Town Walls

The town suffered very little from air raids in the Second World War; the worst case was in 1940, when a woman and her two grandchildren were killed when a cottage was destroyed on Ellesmere Road, the only local air raid deaths. Therefore, many of its ancient buildings remain intact and there was little redevelopment in the 1960s and 1970s. However, some historic buildings were demolished to make way for the brutalist architectural style of the 1960s, though the town was saved from a new inner ring road due to its challenging geography. A notable example of 1960s/70s construction in Shrewsbury was Telecom House on Smithfield Road, demolished in the 2000s.

Between 1962 and 1992 there was a hardened nuclear bunker, built for No 16 Group Royal Observer Corps Shrewsbury, who provided the field force of the United Kingdom Warning and Monitoring Organisation and would have sounded the four-minute warning alarm in the event of war and warned the population of Shrewsbury in the event of approaching radioactive fallout. The building was staffed by up to 120 volunteers who trained on a weekly basis. After the breakup of the communist bloc in 1989, the Royal Observer Corps was disbanded between September 1991 and December 1995. However, the nuclear bunker still stands just inside Holywell Street near the Abbey as a lasting reminder of the Cold War, but is now converted and used as a veterinary practice.

The town was targeted by the IRA in 1992. One bomb was detonated at Shrewsbury Castle, causing severe damage to the regimental museum of the Shropshire Light Infantry, estimated at £250,000, and many artefacts were lost. A second bomb, detonated in the Darwin Shopping Centre, was put out by the sprinkler system before any major damage was caused. Finally, a third bomb was discovered elsewhere in the town centre but failed to do any serious damage.

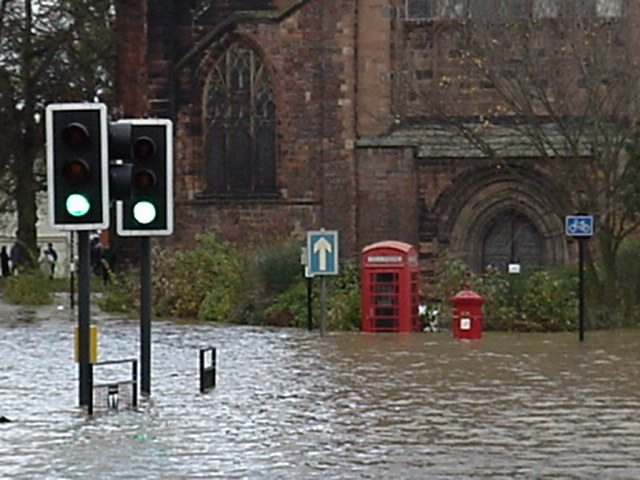
Flooding in Shrewsbury (2000)

From the late 1990s, the town experienced severe flooding problems from the Severn and Rea Brook. In the autumn of 2000 large swathes of the town were under water, notably Frankwell, which flooded three times in six weeks. The Frankwell flood defences were completed in 2003, along with the new offices of Shrewsbury and Atcham Borough Council. More recently, such as in 2005 and 2007 but not 2020, flooding has been less severe and the defences have generally held back floodwaters from the town centre areas. However, the town car parks are often left to be flooded in the winter, which reduces trade in the town, most evidenced in the run up to Christmas in 2007.

Shrewsbury won the West Midlands Capital of Enterprise award in 2004. The town has two large expanding business parks: Shrewsbury Business Park by the A5 in the southeast, and Battlefield Enterprise Park in the north. There are many residential developments currently under construction in the town to cater for the increasing numbers of people wishing to live in the town, which is a popular place from which to commute to Telford, Wolverhampton and Birmingham.

In 2009 Shrewsbury Town Council was formed and the town's traditional coat of arms was returned to everyday use.

In 2021 the lost seal of the town, dating from 1425, was discovered.

== Governance ==
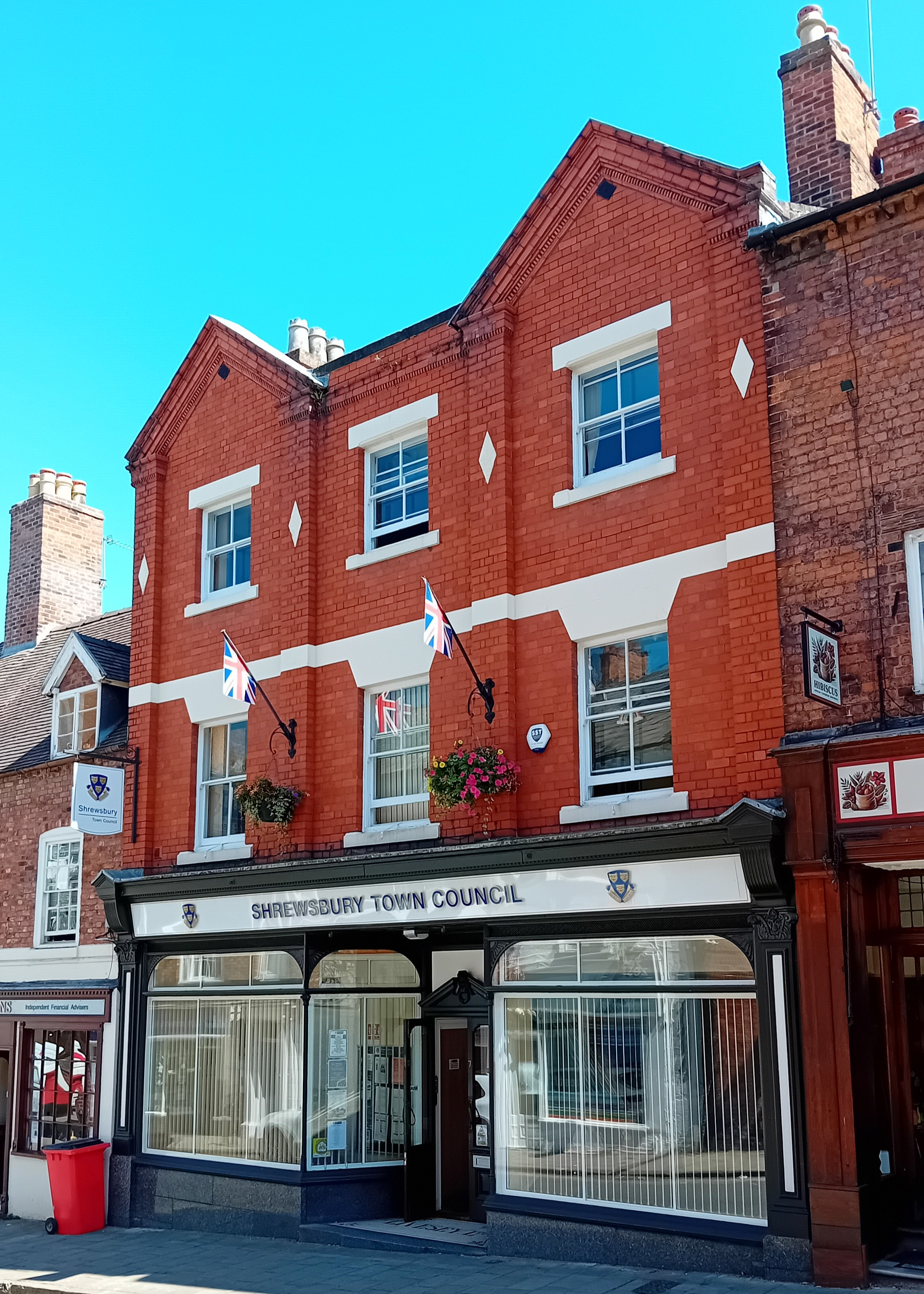
Livesey House, 7 St John's Hill: Town Council's headquarters since 2023

There are two tiers of local government covering Shrewsbury, at parish (town) and unitary authority level: Shrewsbury Town Council and Shropshire Council. The town council is based at Livesey House on St John's Hill. Shropshire Council is also based in the town, at the Guildhall on Frankwell Quay.

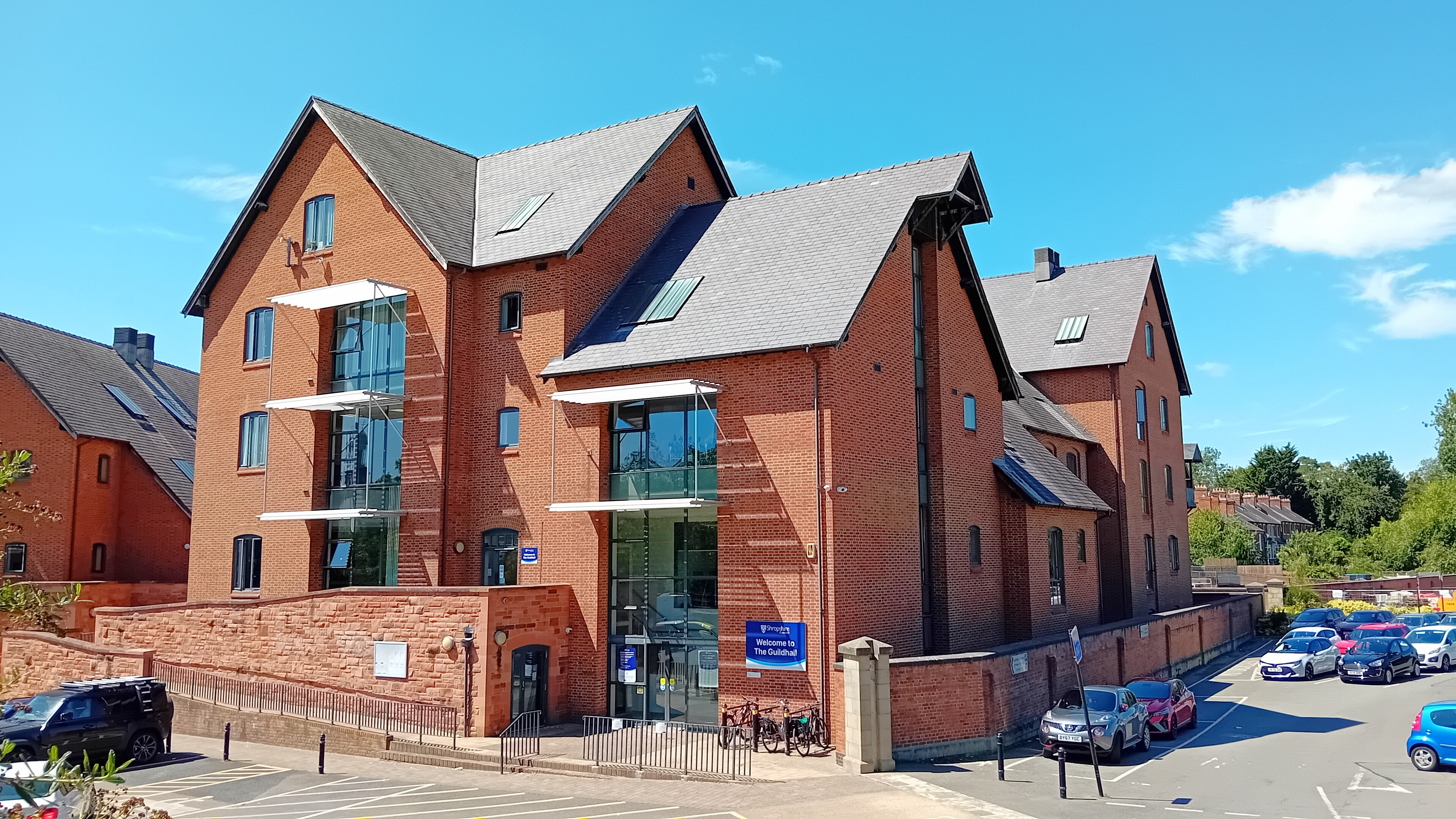
The Guildhall, Frankwell Quay: Shropshire Council's headquarters since 2025

Shrewsbury is in the Shrewsbury constituency and is the only large settlement in the constituency. At the most recent general election, in 2024, Julia Buckley of the Labour Party was elected with a majority of 11,355. The 19th-century Prime Minister, Benjamin Disraeli, was MP for Shrewsbury.

=== Administrative history ===
Shrewsbury was an ancient borough. It was described as a borough in the Domesday Book of 1086, and its earliest known charter was issued by Henry II (reigned 1154–1189). It was reformed to become a municipal borough in 1836 under the Municipal Corporations Act 1835, which standardised how most boroughs operated across the country.

The municipal borough of Shrewsbury was abolished in 1974. Its area merged with the surrounding Atcham Rural District to become a new non-metropolitan district, which was initially called Shrewsbury, but was renamed Shrewsbury and Atcham later in 1974. The new district was granted borough status from its creation.

Shrewsbury and Atcham Borough Council was abolished in 2009, when its functions were taken over by Shropshire County Council, which was renamed Shropshire Council. The town of Shrewsbury had been an unparished area since the 1974 reforms. A new parish of Shrewsbury was established as part of the 2009 reforms, with the parish council adopting the name Shrewsbury Town Council.

==== Coat of arms ====
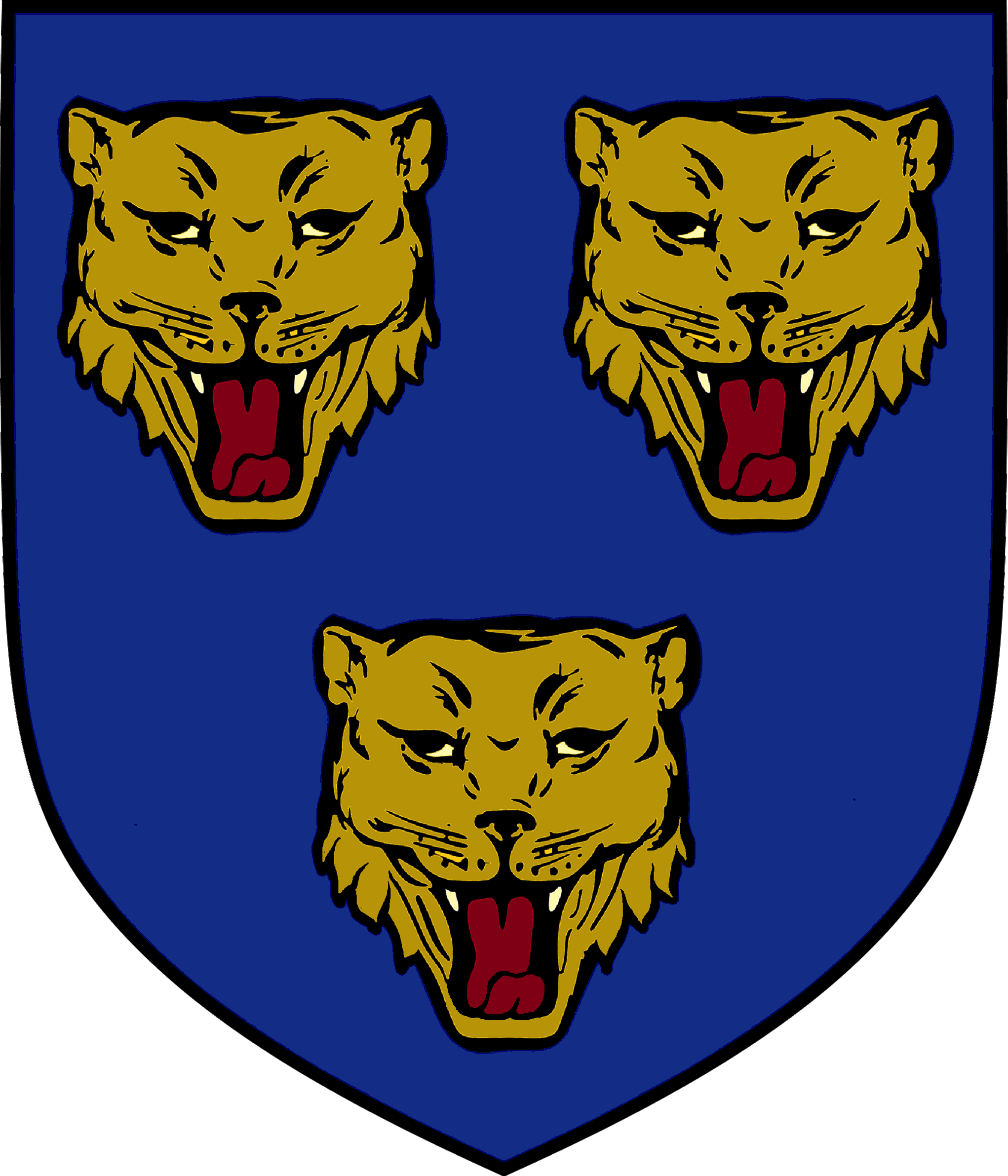
Coat of arms

The coat of arms of the former Shrewsbury Borough Council and now of the Town Council, depicts three loggerheads (leopards), with the motto Floreat Salopia, a Latin phrase that can be translated to "May Shrewsbury Flourish". The coat of arms of the (now abolished) Shrewsbury and Atcham Borough Council was Shrewsbury's shield with the addition of Atcham Bridge running above the leopards. The flag of Shropshire, and other county crests, also uses the three loggerheads.

=== Affiliations ===
Shrewsbury was twinned with Zutphen, Netherlands from 1977 until 2018. The Royal Navy submarine, HMS Talent, decommissioned in 2022, was affiliated with Shrewsbury.

== Geography ==
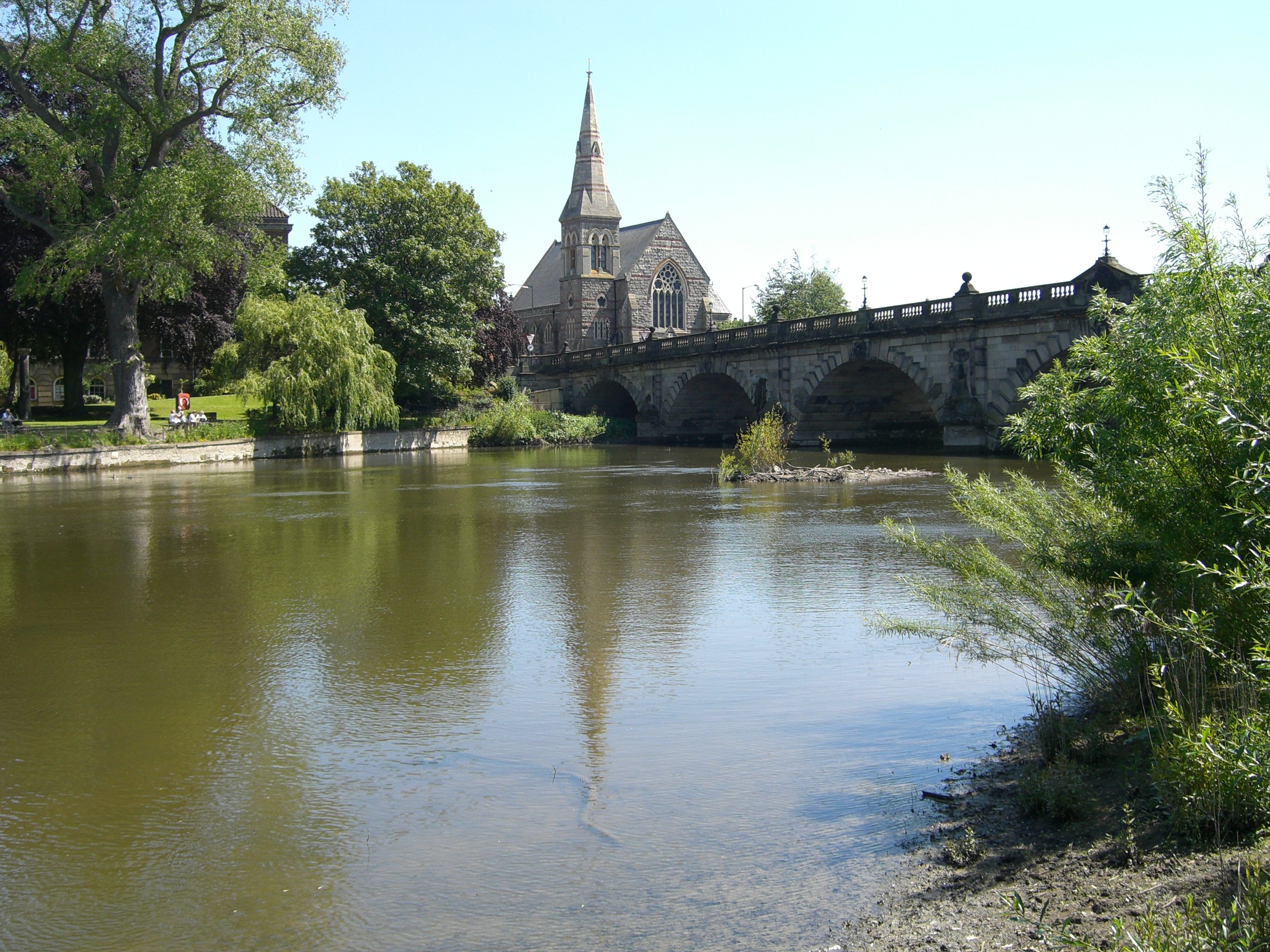
The River Severn at the English Bridge

Shrewsbury is about 14 miles (23 km) west of Telford, and 43 miles (69 km) northwest of Birmingham. The border with Wales is 9 miles (14 km) to the west.

The town centre is partially built on a hill whose elevation is, at its highest, 246 feet (75 m) above sea level. The longest river in the United Kingdom, the River Severn, flows through the town, forming a meander around its centre. The Rea Brook is a small river that has its confluence with the Severn at Shrewsbury, just upstream from the English Bridge, and much of the Rea Brook Valley within the town is a country park and local nature reserve, encompassing 36 hectares (89 acres). The town is subject to flooding from these rivers.

Areas of Shrewsbury

=== Geology ===
The town lies to the west of Haughmond Hill, a site where Precambrian rocks, some of the oldest rocks in the county can be found, and the town itself is sited on an area of largely Carboniferous rocks. A fault, the Hodnet Fault, starts near the town and runs north-east into the Stoke-on-Trent area.

=== Climate ===
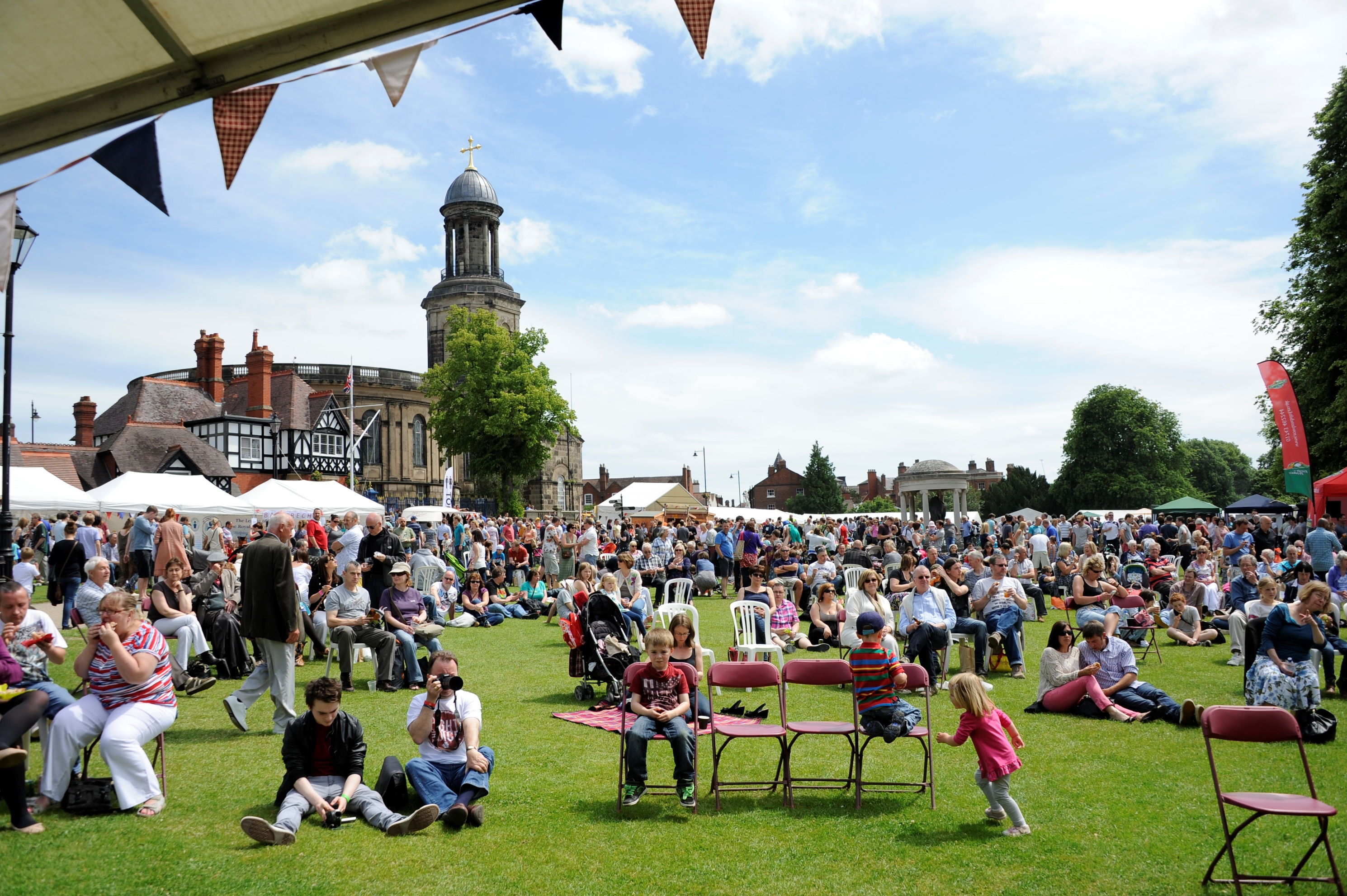
The Quarry is often busy during spring and summer.

The climate of Shrewsbury is similar to that of the rest of Shropshire, generally moderate.

Annual rainfall is typically 76 to 100 cm (30 to 39 in), influenced by being in the rainshadow of the Cambrian Mountains from warm, moist frontal systems of the Atlantic Ocean, which bring generally light precipitation in autumn and spring. The nearest weather station is at Shawbury, about 6.5 miles (10.5 km) north-east of Shrewsbury town centre. The local topography, being that of a low-lying plain surrounded by higher ground to the west, south and east gives the Shrewsbury area its own microclimate – the absolute maximum at Shawbury of 34.9 °C (94.8 °F) and absolute minimum of −25.2 °C (−13.4 °F) represents the largest temperature range of any individual weather station in the British Isles – although the maximum range of average temperatures tends to peak to the south-east of the Shrewsbury area, particularly in the south-east Midlands, inland East Anglia and inland south-east England. In an average year, the warmest day is 28.4 °C (83.1 °F), giving a total of 8.9 days of 25.1 °C (77.2 °F) or above. The absolute maximum of 34.9 °C (94.8 °F) was recorded in August 1990.

Conversely, the coldest night of the year typically falls to −9.6 °C (14.7 °F) – in total 61.7 air frosts are recorded in an average year. The absolute minimum of −25.2 °C (−13.4 °F) was recorded in 1981.

Annual average rainfall averages around 650 millimetres (26 in), with over 1 millimetre (0.04 in) falling on 124 days of the year.

Climate data for Shawbury (Note: RAF Shawbury is located approximately 7 miles (11 km) NE of Shrewsbury, and 12 miles (19 km) NW of Telford.) WMO ID: 03414; coordinates 52°47′41″N 2°39′53″W; elevation: 72 m (236 ft); 1991–2020 normals, extremes 1960–present
Month	Jan	Feb	Mar	Apr	May	Jun	Jul	Aug	Sep	Oct	Nov	Dec	Year
Record high °C (°F)	14.6 (58.3)	17.4 (63.3)	21.5 (70.7)	25.2 (77.4)	26.7 (80.1)	31.2 (88.2)	35.7 (96.3)	36.4 (97.5)	29.6 (85.3)	28.1 (82.6)	18.4 (65.1)	15.4 (59.7)	36.4 (97.5)
Mean daily maximum °C (°F)	7.5 (45.5)	8.1 (46.6)	10.3 (50.5)	13.2 (55.8)	16.3 (61.3)	19.1 (66.4)	21.1 (70.0)	20.7 (69.3)	18.1 (64.6)	14.2 (57.6)	10.3 (50.5)	7.7 (45.9)	13.9 (57.0)
Daily mean °C (°F)	4.3 (39.7)	4.6 (40.3)	6.3 (43.3)	8.6 (47.5)	11.5 (52.7)	14.4 (57.9)	16.3 (61.3)	16.0 (60.8)	13.7 (56.7)	10.4 (50.7)	6.9 (44.4)	4.5 (40.1)	9.8 (49.6)
Mean daily minimum °C (°F)	1.2 (34.2)	1.2 (34.2)	2.3 (36.1)	3.9 (39.0)	6.8 (44.2)	9.6 (49.3)	11.5 (52.7)	11.4 (52.5)	9.3 (48.7)	6.6 (43.9)	3.5 (38.3)	1.3 (34.3)	5.7 (42.3)
Record low °C (°F)	−21.4 (−6.5)	−12.9 (8.8)	−12.2 (10.0)	−5.9 (21.4)	−3.3 (26.1)	−0.5 (31.1)	2.5 (36.5)	0.8 (33.4)	−2.5 (27.5)	−5.9 (21.4)	−12.5 (9.5)	−25.2 (−13.4)	−25.2 (−13.4)
Average precipitation mm (inches)	57.4 (2.26)	43.3 (1.70)	43.4 (1.71)	47.1 (1.85)	53.6 (2.11)	59.0 (2.32)	57.6 (2.27)	64.2 (2.53)	61.1 (2.41)	68.8 (2.71)	60.8 (2.39)	66.3 (2.61)	682.5 (26.87)
Average snowfall mm (inches)	26 (1.0)	19 (0.7)	3 (0.1)	4 (0.2)	0 (0)	0 (0)	0 (0)	0 (0)	0 (0)	0 (0)	1 (0.0)	27 (1.1)	80 (3.1)
Average precipitation days (≥ 1.0 mm)	12.1	10.8	10.2	10.4	10.0	10.1	10.5	10.5	10.0	11.3	12.5	13.1	131.6
Average snowy days	3.0	2.9	1.1	0.3	0.0	0.0	0.0	0.0	0.0	0.0	0.2	1.6	9.1
Average relative humidity (%)	90	87	84	83	82	84	83	83	86	88	90	90	86
Mean monthly sunshine hours	52.8	74.9	114.6	158.1	194.9	187.5	193.3	168.0	134.7	97.5	61.8	49.9	1,487.8
Mean daily daylight hours	8.3	9.9	11.9	14.0	15.8	16.8	16.3	14.7	12.7	10.6	8.7	7.7	12.3
Average ultraviolet index	2	2	2	3	4	4	4	4	3	3	2	2	3
Source 1: Met Office European Climate Assessment and Dataset
Source 2: WeatherAtlas

== Demography ==
In 2021, the town of Shrewsbury had a population of 76,782. This represents an increase of 0.69% since 2011. The ethnic distribution was as follows: White – 72,975; Asian – 1755; Black – 348; Arab – 122; Mixed – 1,267; Other – 308.

Religious affiliations were as follows: Christian – 52.7%; Muslim – 0.5%; Sikh – 0.5%; Buddhist – 0.3%; Hindu – 0.2%; Jewish – 0.1%; Other – 0.1%; No religion – 39.1%; No answer – 6.4%.

== Economy ==
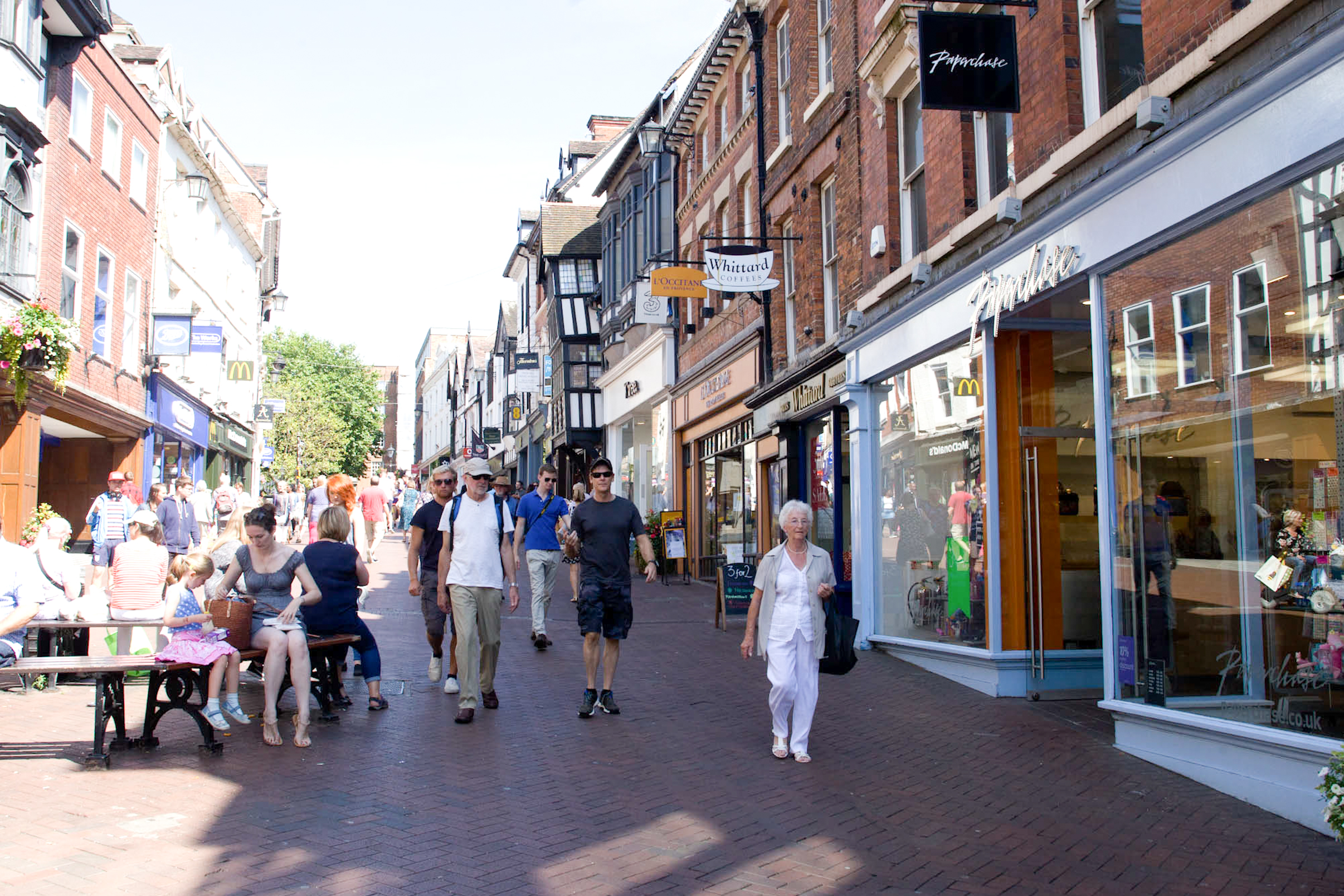
Pride Hill, one of the town's main shopping streets, in 2016

Throughout the medieval period, Shrewsbury was a centre for the wool trade, and later used its position on the River Severn to transport goods across England via the canal system.

By the early 1900s, the town became focused on transport services and the general service and professional sector, owing to its position on the A5, part of the strategic route to North Wales. Unlike many other towns in this period, Shrewsbury never became a major centre for heavy industry though, in 1915, the Sentinel Waggon Works at Shrewsbury was opened for the building of steam rail and road locomotives. Later it converted to the production of diesel locomotives before being taken over, in 1958, by Rolls-Royce Limited for the manufacture of their range of diesel industrial engines, so that the Derby facility could concentrate on aero engines.

The town is the location of both town and county councils and a number of retail complexes, both in and out of the town centre. These provide significant employment. Shrewsbury is home to a high number of independent businesses, including shops, cafes and restaurants. Wyle Cop in Shrewsbury is said to have the 'longest uninterrupted row of independent shops'. Four in five jobs in the town are in the service industry. Within this sector, the largest employers are the administration and distribution sectors, which includes retail, food and accommodation.

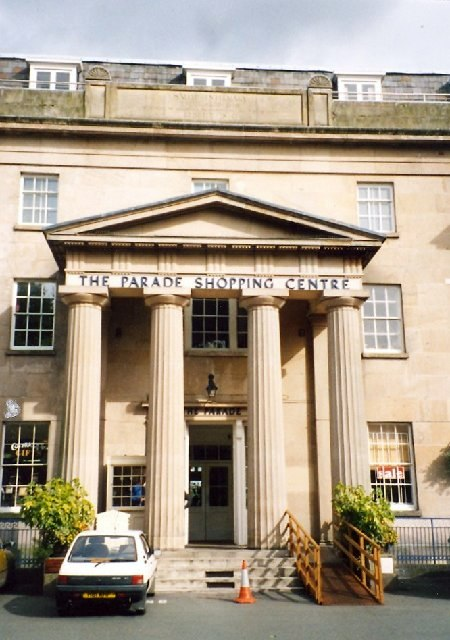
The Parade Shopping Centre is housed in the former premises of the Royal Salop Infirmary.

Shrewsbury has two shopping centres. The Darwin shopping centre houses many high street retailers such as Marks & Spencer, H&M, JD Sports and Primark. The Parade Shopping Centre is a second centre exclusively housing independent retailers. Additionally, the town features the Shrewsbury Market Hall, an indoor market with a variety of independent traders. The market has been named "Britain's Favourite Market" in 2018, 2023, 2024, and 2025 by the National Association of British Market Authorities (NABMA). There are two retail warehouse clusters: at Meole Brace Retail Park to the south and at Sundorne Retail Park to the north. Major supermarkets in the town are the Tesco Extra at Harlescott, Morrisons on Whitchurch Road, Asda on Old Potts Way and Sainsbury's at Meole Brace.

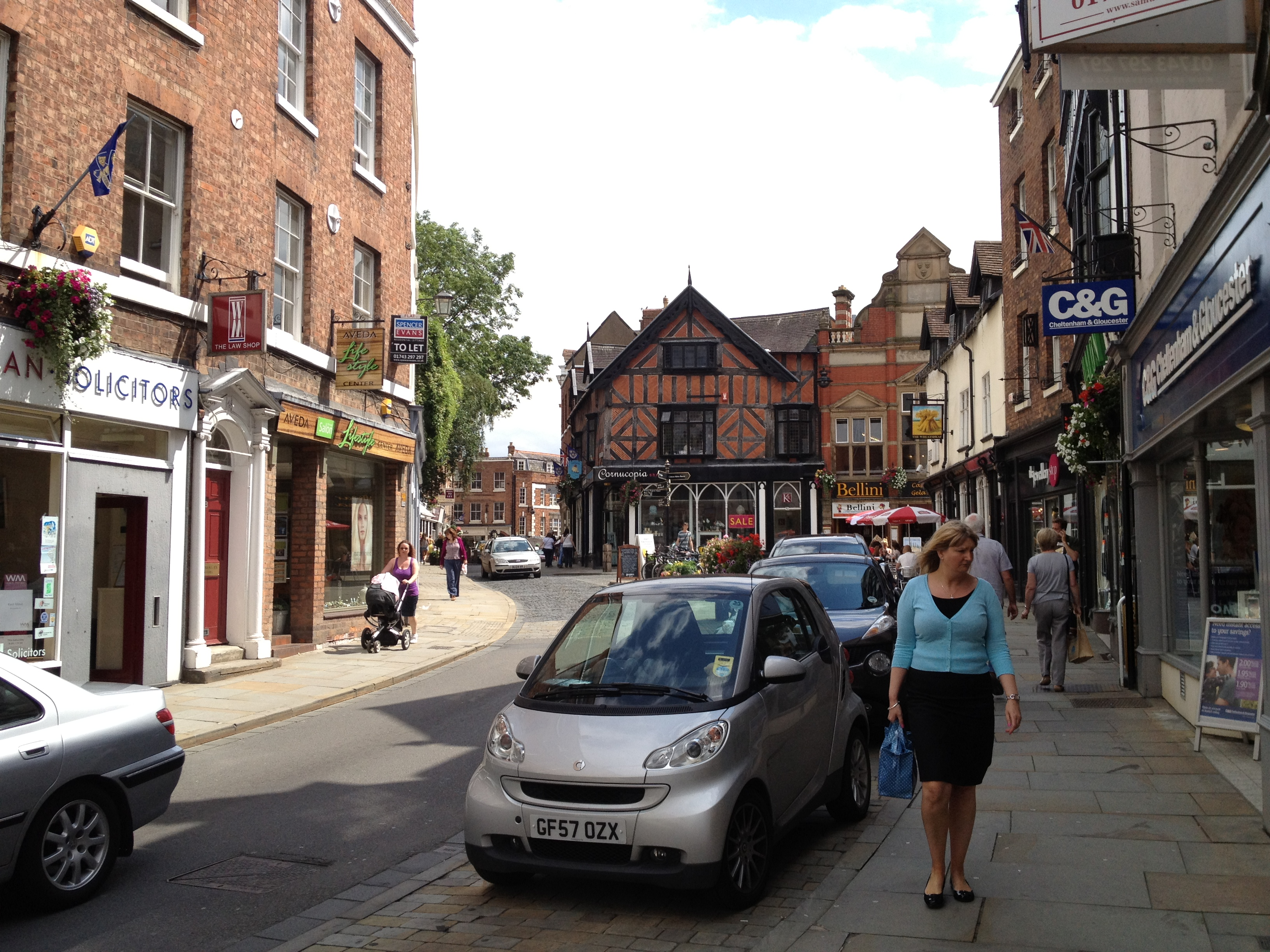
High Street, facing the top of Wyle Cop, in 2012

The visitor economy of Shrewsbury and Atcham was worth about £115 million in 2001, with about 2,500 people employed directly in the visitor industry and 3,400 indirectly. There were about 3.1 million visitors – both day visitors and staying visitors – to the borough in 2001, with 88% being day visitors and 12% being staying visitors; staying visitors accounted for 42% of spending. Shrewsbury's position of being the only sizeable town for a large area, especially to the west in Mid-Wales, allows it to attract a large retail base beyond that of its resident population. This is not only evident in the retail sector, but also in the healthcare sector, where the Royal Shrewsbury Hospital has the only A&E department westwards until Aberystwyth, about 75 miles (121 km) away.

Businesses in Shrewsbury voted in favour of a Business Improvement District in late 2013 and Shrewsbury BID started operating in April 2014. Shrewsbury BID delivers on a five-year business plan of projects, which include major destination marketing campaigns, significant cost savings for businesses and strategic work ensuring the best possible town centre environment in which business can flourish. The company is governed by a board of directors and employed three staff full-time in 2017.

In terms of social and economic deprivation, according to the Overall Index of Multiple Deprivation of 2004, one Super Output Area (SOA) in the town is in the bottom 15% of all areas nationally. This area is in the ward of Harlescott. A further four SOAs fall into the bottom 30% nationally, these being in the wards of Monkmoor, Sundorne, Battlefield and Heathgates and Meole Brace. The most affluent areas of the town are generally to the south and west, around the grounds of Shrewsbury School and the Copthorne area.

== Culture ==
=== Literary and performance heritage ===
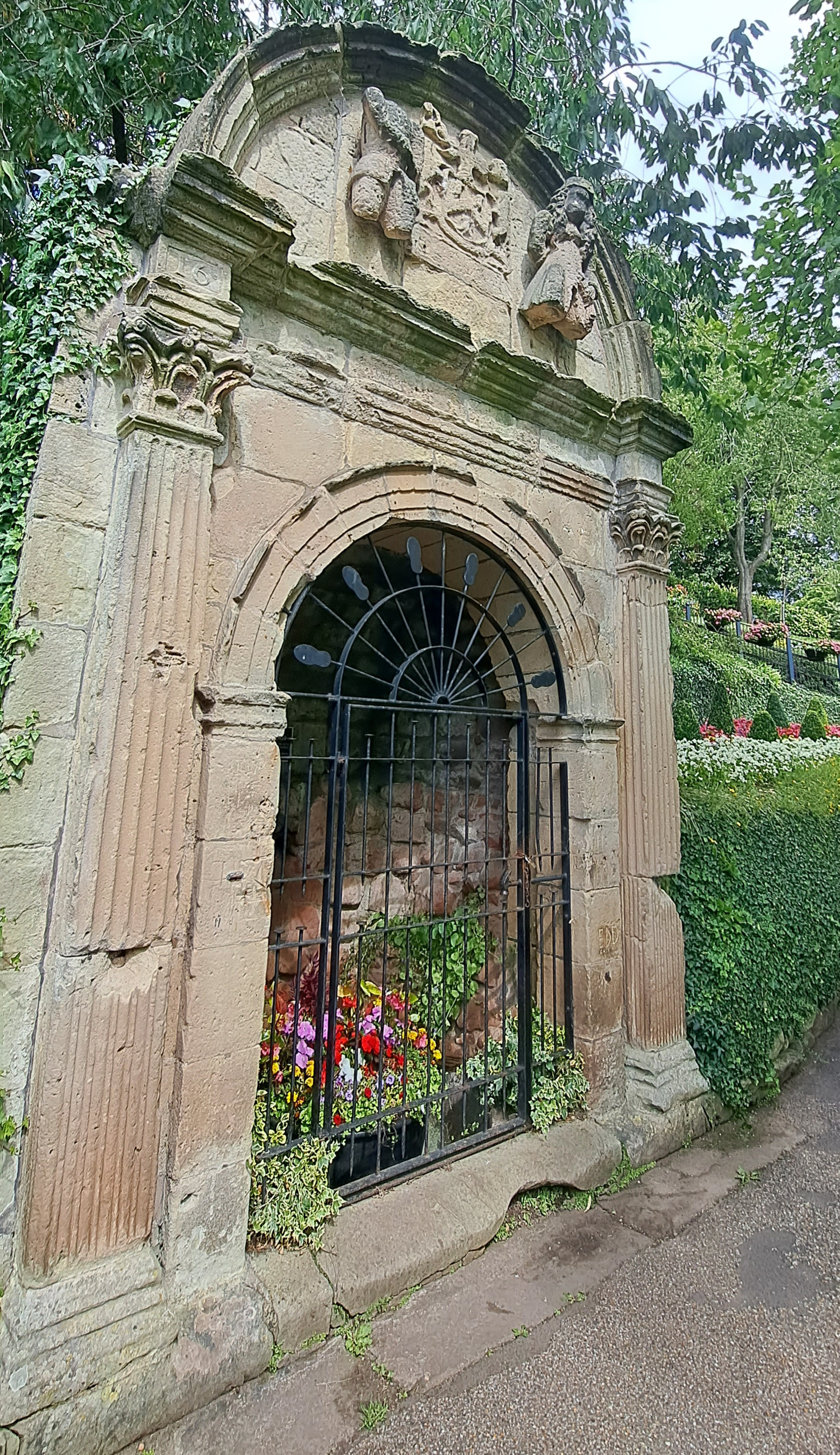
A surviving 1679 arbour, that of the Shoemakers Guild

Prior to the Reformation, there are accounts of major festivals in Kingsland:

In ancient times, while the Romish religion prevailed, all the companies united once a year in celebrating the day of Corpus Christi, with great pomp and splendour. At the reformation this ceremony was commuted for another, held on the second Monday after Trinity Sunday, which is still continued, though with less pomp and circumstance than formerly. The Companies form themselves into processions, headed severally by men on horseback in gaudy apparel, called kings, probably as representatives of the monarchs who granted their charters* They move in marshalled array to Kingsland, where they are met by the mayor and corporation and the day is spent in festivity.

The town's Quarry Park has been the site of cultural activity since before the Reformation: a bank there, cut in the form of an amphitheatre, was used by the friars of the adjacent convent, who performed the ancient religious mystery plays or miracle plays; this continued in the mid-16th century when the plays of Thomas Ashton's Shrewsbury School attracted royal attention. On several occasions the school put on pageants for the visiting Council of Wales and the Marches. In 1581, the Lord President, Sir Henry Sidney, leaving the town by barge, was greeted by several scholars on an island downstream of the castle dressed as green nymphs with willow branches tied to their heads reciting verses across the water.

In the later Renaissance period, the land at Kingsland was devoted to elaborate performances, with grand arbours being built by the various town guilds. Some of the arbours survive, such as that for the Shoemakers Guild.

Quarto edition of Henry IV, Part 1

William Shakespeare set the last two acts of his play, Henry IV, Part 1, written around 1596, near the town. It has been suggested, placing reliance on a record of a performance by his company, the King's Men in the town between 1603 and 1605, and supposed familiarity with the landscape; that Shakespeare performed in the town and knew the area. Edward I's 13th century engagement with the town, and the execution of Welsh Prince Dafydd ap Gruffydd, was dramatized in George Peele's Elizabethan play 'The Famous Chronicle of King Edward the First' (c.1592).

The playwright George Farquhar's 1706 play The Recruiting Officer is set in the town, where Farquhar himself had been stationed.

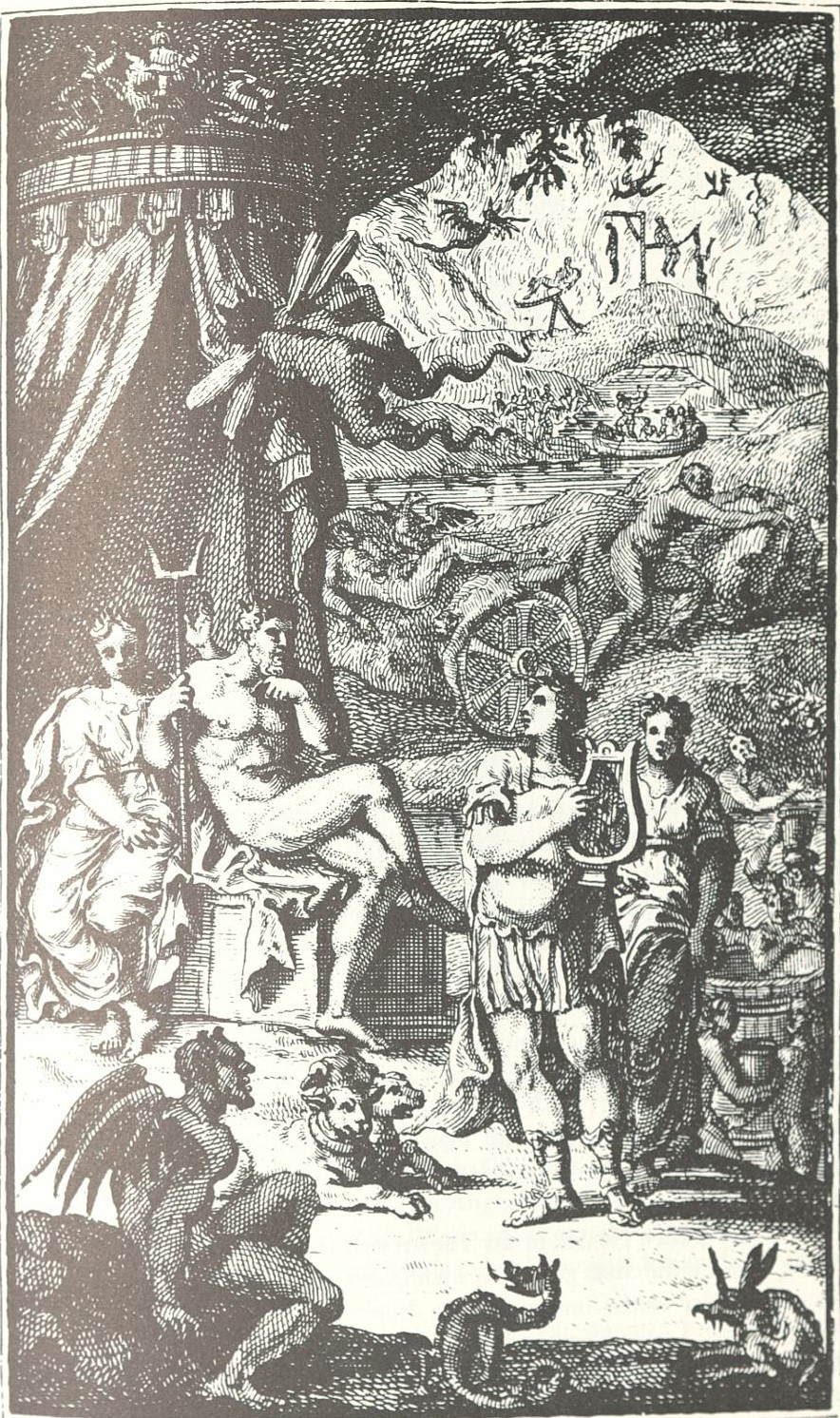
John Weaver's 1718 production of Orpheus and Eurydice

Known as the father of English ballet, as well as the originator of pantomime, John Weaver, developed his art in Shrewsbury. A second generation dancing master in the town, he also wrote on the philosophy, theology, statecraft and biology embedded in his era's understating of dance, which he located in a wider understanding of his culture as representing a component of Ptolemaic harmony and an earnest part of the statecraft of his time.

=== In modern popular culture ===
Pioneering early 18th-century travel writers Daniel Defoe and Celia Fiennes wrote about their visits to Shrewsbury in A Tour thro' the Whole Island of Great Britain and Through England on a Side Saddle in the Time of William and Mary respectively.

In the 19th century, Charles Dickens made three visits to the town. The first, in 1838, was while he was travelling to Wales. On this occasion he stayed at the Lion Hotel. In 1852 he again visited, this time as part of a theatrical tour, staging benefit performances to raise money for the Guild of Literature and Art. His final visit, in 1858, was as part of a nationwide reading tour. Once again he stayed at the Lion.

The town appears in the Brother Cadfael novels by Ellis Peters. The novels take Shrewsbury Abbey for their setting and have made medieval Shrewsbury familiar to a wide readership.

Shrewsbury was used as the setting for the 1984 television film A Christmas Carol, which filmed many of its interior and exterior shots in and around the town.

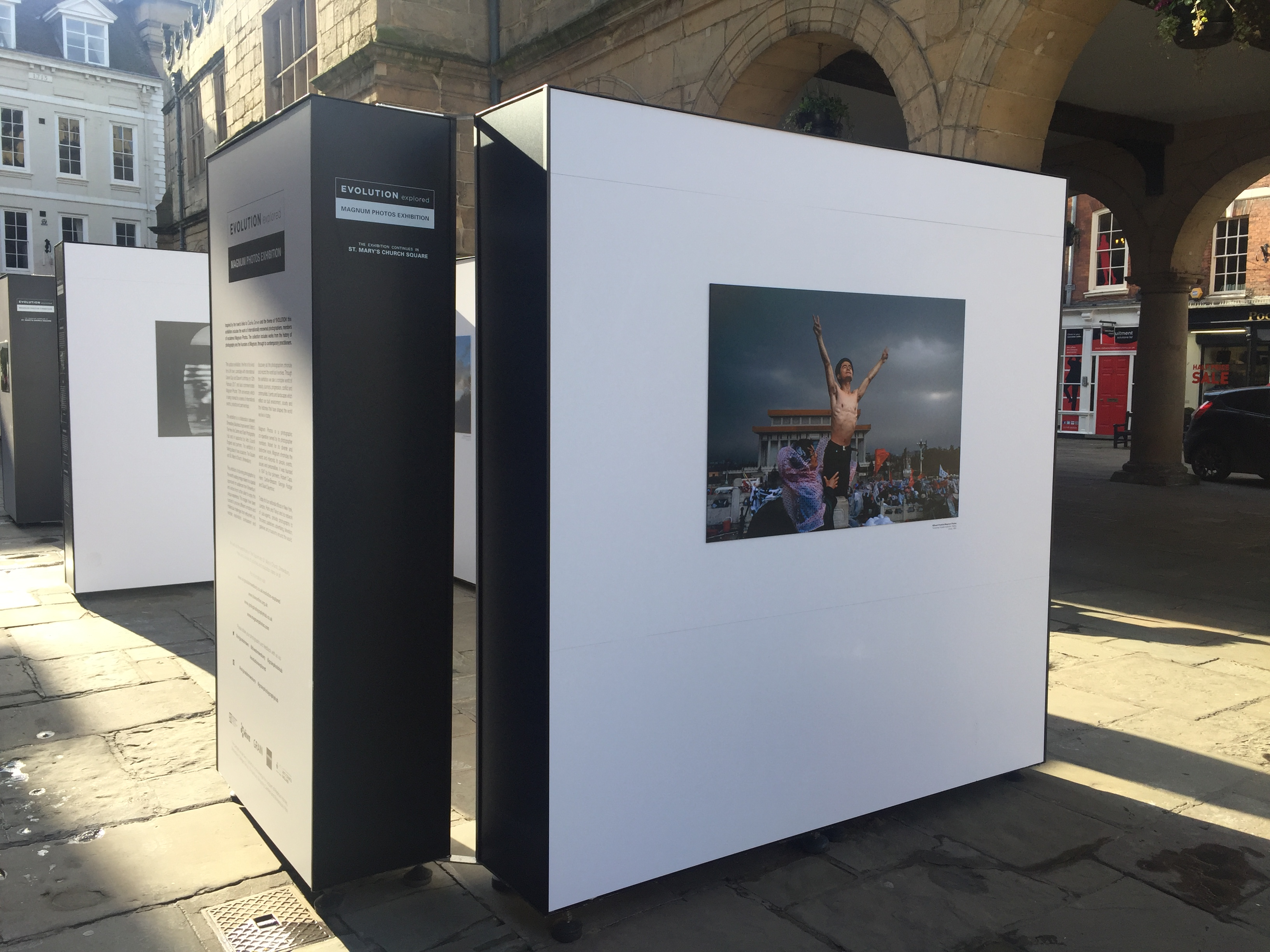
The Magnum Photos Evolution Explored exhibition in The Square

In early 2017, Shrewsbury BID, The Hive and GRAIN Photography Hub organised an outdoor Magnum Photos exhibition. Inspired by Shrewsbury's links to Charles Darwin, this exhibition considered the theme of evolution through the eyes of international photographers. The 10-week exhibition was free to the public and staged at St Mary's Churchyard and The Square.

In 2022, the BBC production of Great Expectations with Olivia Colman and Tom Hardy was filmed in the town. The same year, episodes of The Apprentice and Celebrity Hunted were filmed in Shrewsbury. The prison was used for the BBC TV series Time as well appearing in the ITV remake of The Ipcress File.

=== Contemporary performance ===
Theatre Severn is the town's main performing arts complex, it is situated in Frankwell next to the Welsh Bridge on the bank of the River Severn. The theatre includes two performance spaces, the 635 seat Main Auditorium and a smaller studio space, the Walker Theatre, which can accommodate 250 seating or 500 standing. The venue includes a full sized dance studio, function rooms and a restaurant. The new complex replaced the old theatre, the Music Hall, which was refurbished and expanded for its current use as home to Shrewsbury Museum and Art Gallery, opened 2014.

== Royal visits ==
The following royal visits have been made to Shrewsbury in modern times:

- The Duchess of Kent and Princess Victoria visited in 1832.
- The Duke of Cambridge visited in 1886 when he inspected the Shropshire Yeomanry on the racecourse.
- Princess Louise, visited in 1898.
- The Duke of Teck (later Marquess of Cambridge) visited the town in 1911.
- George V visited the town in 1914.
- In 1925 Princess Helena Victoria visited the town.
- 1925 saw a shopping visit to Shrewsbury by Queen Mary who arrived in Yorton.
- In 1929 the Sultan of Zanzibar and the Sultan of Oman made visits to Shrewsbury.
- The future Edward VIII, then Prince of Wales, visited in 1932.
- As Princess Elizabeth, Elizabeth II visited in 1949.
- Queen Elizabeth II and Prince Philip, Duke of Edinburgh visited in 1952.
- Elizabeth II and Prince Philip returned in 1967 to open Shirehall.
- Charles, Prince of Wales, opened a new hospital building for the Royal Shrewsbury Hospital in 1978.
- In 1981 The Prince of Wales returned
- Princess Margaret came in 1984, while officially visiting a restored library in the town.
- Queen Elizabeth The Queen Mother came in the 1990s.
- Charles, Prince of Wales visited in 2001.
- Anne, Princess Royal visited Shrewsbury in 2011.
- Princess Alexandra visited in 2022.
- Queen Camilla visited in 2024.

== Festivals and events ==
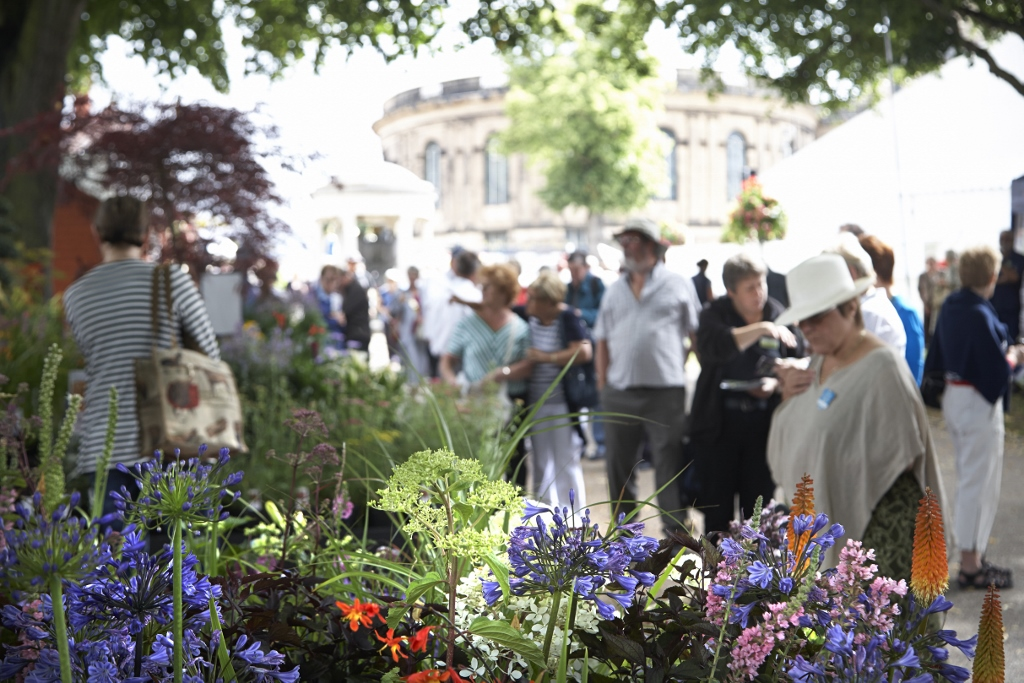
The Shropshire Horticultural Society organises the town's annual flower show in August.

The town is home to the 'longest running flower show in the world'. The annual Shrewsbury Flower Show is a two-day event, which takes place in mid-August, has been running for more than 125 years. The event attracts around 100,000 visitors each year and offers a multitude of events, exhibitions and gardens, with a fireworks display at the end of each day.

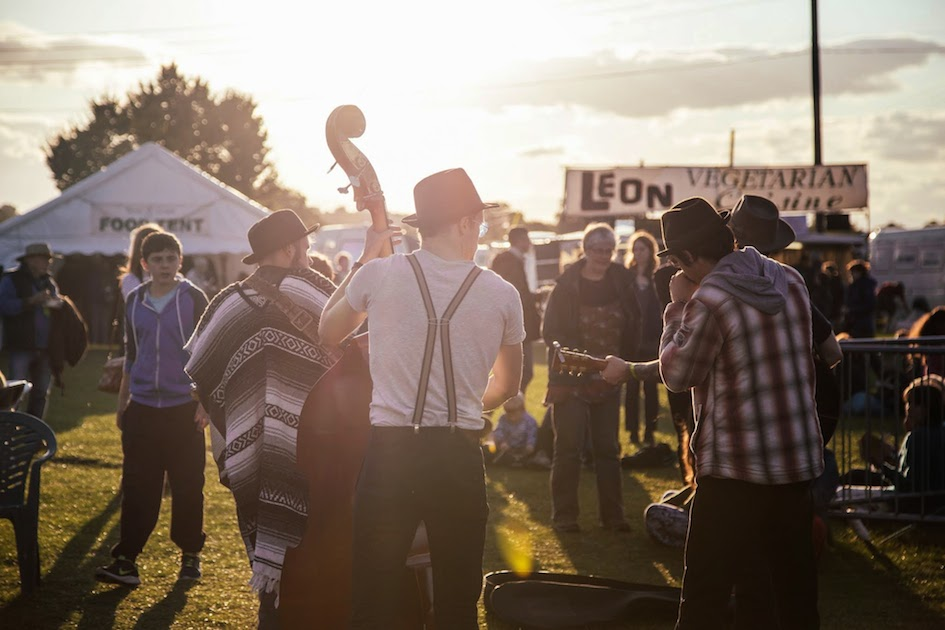
The Shrewsbury Folk Festival is held at the Shropshire Agricultural Showground.

The Shrewsbury Folk Festival has been held in Shrewsbury since 2006. Held annually over the August bank holiday, the event is very popular, with people travelling from across the UK to attend.

The Shrewsbury Arts Trail is focused on showcasing contemporary art and includes sculptures, exhibitions, workshops and events. 2024' theme is "Time" and features work by renowned artists alongside local artists.

The town celebrates its links to Darwin with an annual Darwin Festival in February. The two and a half week multi-media event celebrates the town as the 'Origin of Independent Thinking' with activities including lectures, dance performances and live music.

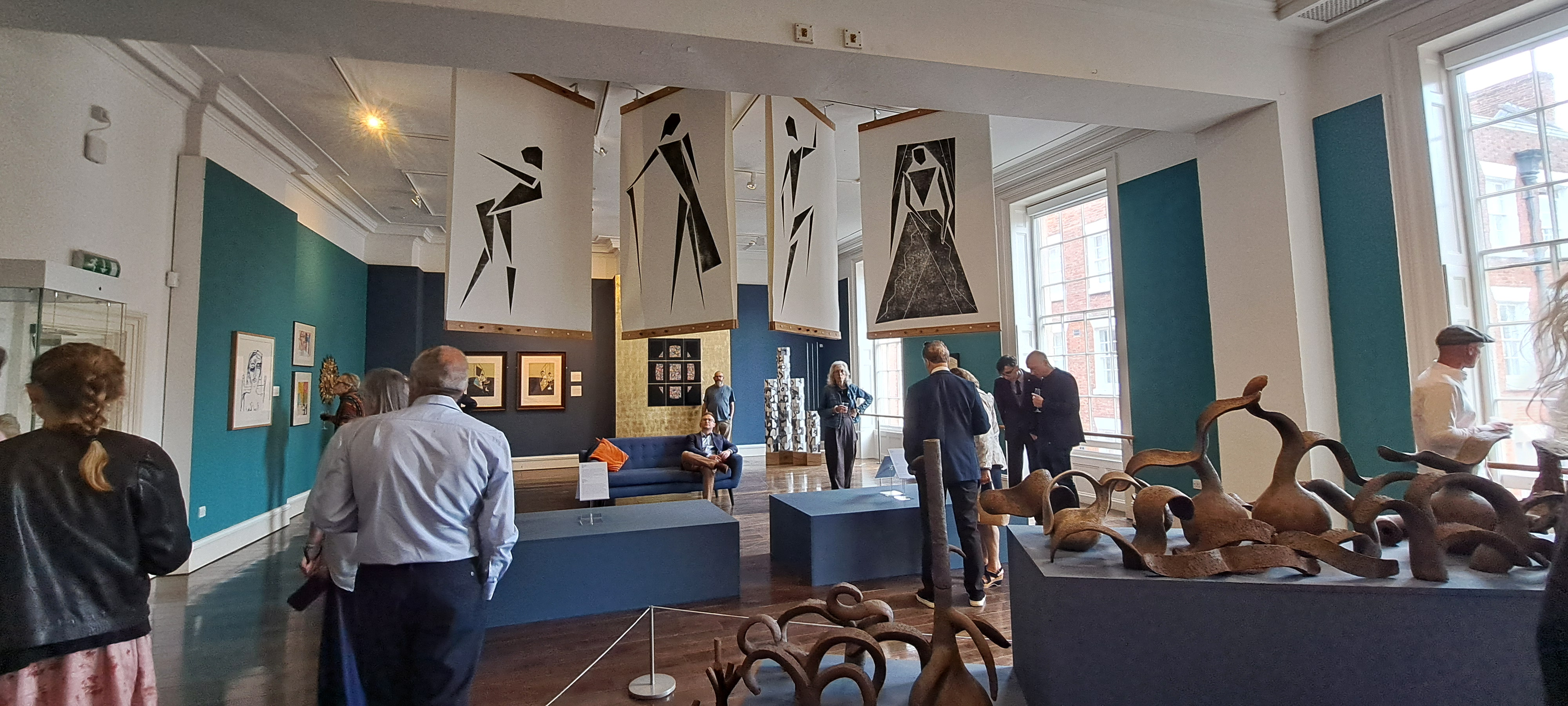
Art Exhibition in Shrewsbury Museum and Art Gallery

Other events held in spring and summer include the Shrewsbury Bookfest, Shrewsbury Regatta, Cycle Grand Prix, Shrewsbury Carnival, Food Festival, Dragon Boat Race and the Coracle World Championships. Since 2016, Shrewsbury International Comedy Festival has been held over the third weekend of July in multiple venues across town.

Comics Salopia (formerly the Cartoon Festival) was a large biannual festival of the comics arts, attracting over a quarter of a million visitors. In format and scope it aimed to emulate on a smaller scale, the Angoulême International Comics Festival in France. In June 2023, it was announced that after making substantial losses in 2022, it would not be continued.

== Museums and attractions ==
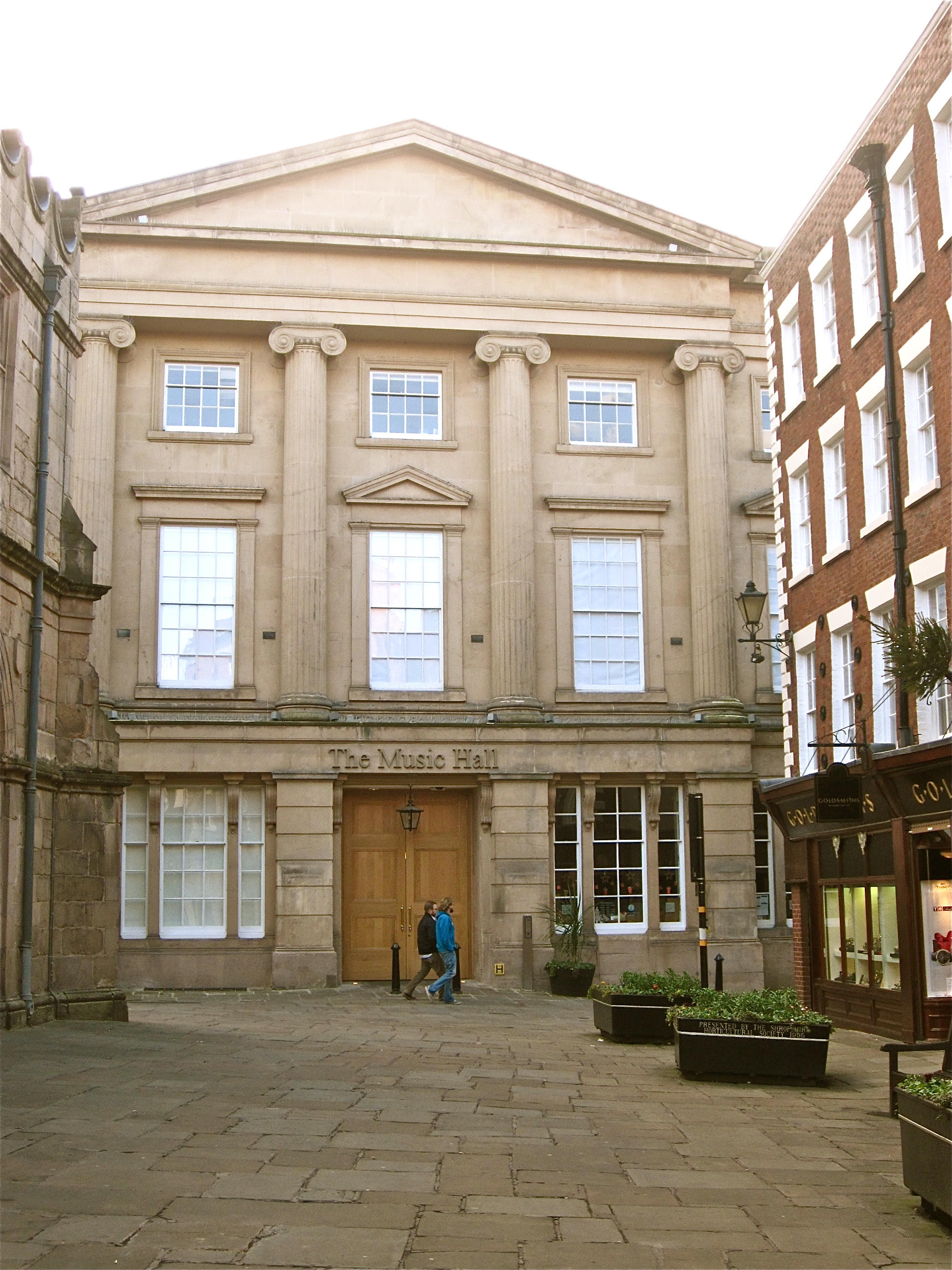
Shrewsbury Museum and Art Gallery

The Shrewsbury Museum and Art Gallery is in the town square, occupying the former music hall and the 13th-century Vaughan's mansion and is part of Shropshire Museums.

The Old Market Hall cinema opened in 2004 in the prominent Tudor market hall positioned in The Square. The independent cinema features daily screens of films from around the world along with a cafe and bar.

Further museums in the town include the Shropshire Regimental Museum, renamed in 2019 as Soldiers of Shropshire Museum, based at Shrewsbury Castle, and the restored 19th-century steam-powered Coleham Pumping Station, which opens for tours on specific days each year.

There are various private galleries and art shops around the town, including the Gateway Education and Arts Centre.

The National Trust owns the last remaining Town Walls Tower which dates from the 14th century. It is now available to rent as a one bedroom holiday cottage.

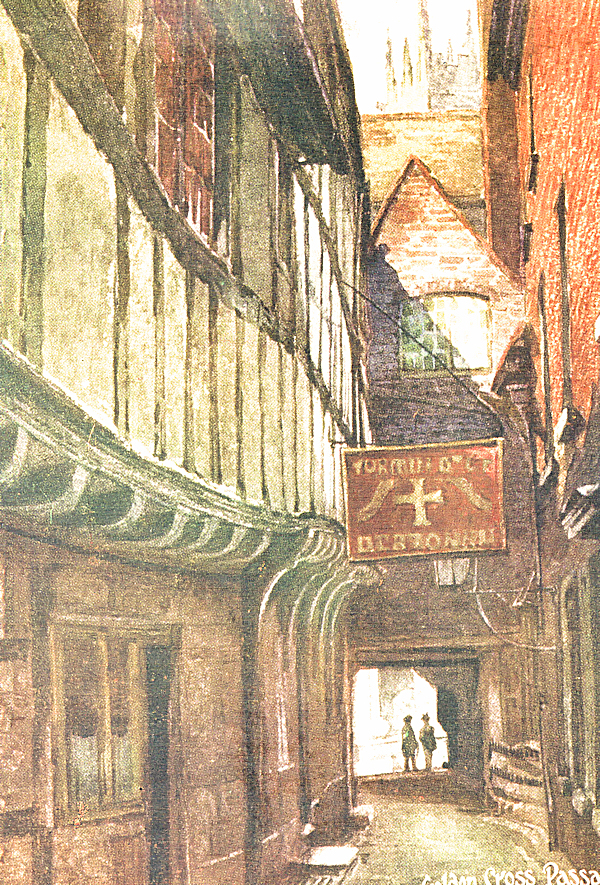
The Golden Cross

The town has some very old public houses and coaching inns:

- The Golden Cross is reputed to be the oldest licensed public house in Shrewsbury and records show that it was used as an inn as far back as 1428; its original name was the Sextry, because it began as the sacristy of Old St Chad's Church.
- The King's Head in Mardol contains a 14th-century wall painting, and its timbers have been dated to c.1404.
- The Dun Cow in Abbey Foregate dates to the 16th century.

== Media ==
Two newspapers are published for Shrewsbury – the local edition of the county's Shropshire Star and the more traditional Shrewsbury Chronicle, which is one of the oldest weekly newspapers in the country, having produced its first edition in 1772. The forerunner of Private Eye was a school magazine edited by Richard Ingrams, Willie Rushton, Christopher Booker and Paul Foot at Shrewsbury School in the mid-1950s.

Local news and television programmes are provided by BBC West Midlands and ITV Central. Television signals are received from the Wrekin TV transmitter.

There are three radio stations that specifically serve either the Shrewsbury area or encompass it as part of a Shropshire-wide broadcast. They are Hits Radio Black Country & Shropshire; BBC Radio Shropshire, which is based in Shrewsbury; and, as of September 2020, Greatest Hits Radio Black Country & Shropshire, which previously broadcast from the Shropshire Star building in Telford.

In 2009 an online independent media company, Shropshire Live, launched covering Shrewsbury and Shropshire.

== Food ==
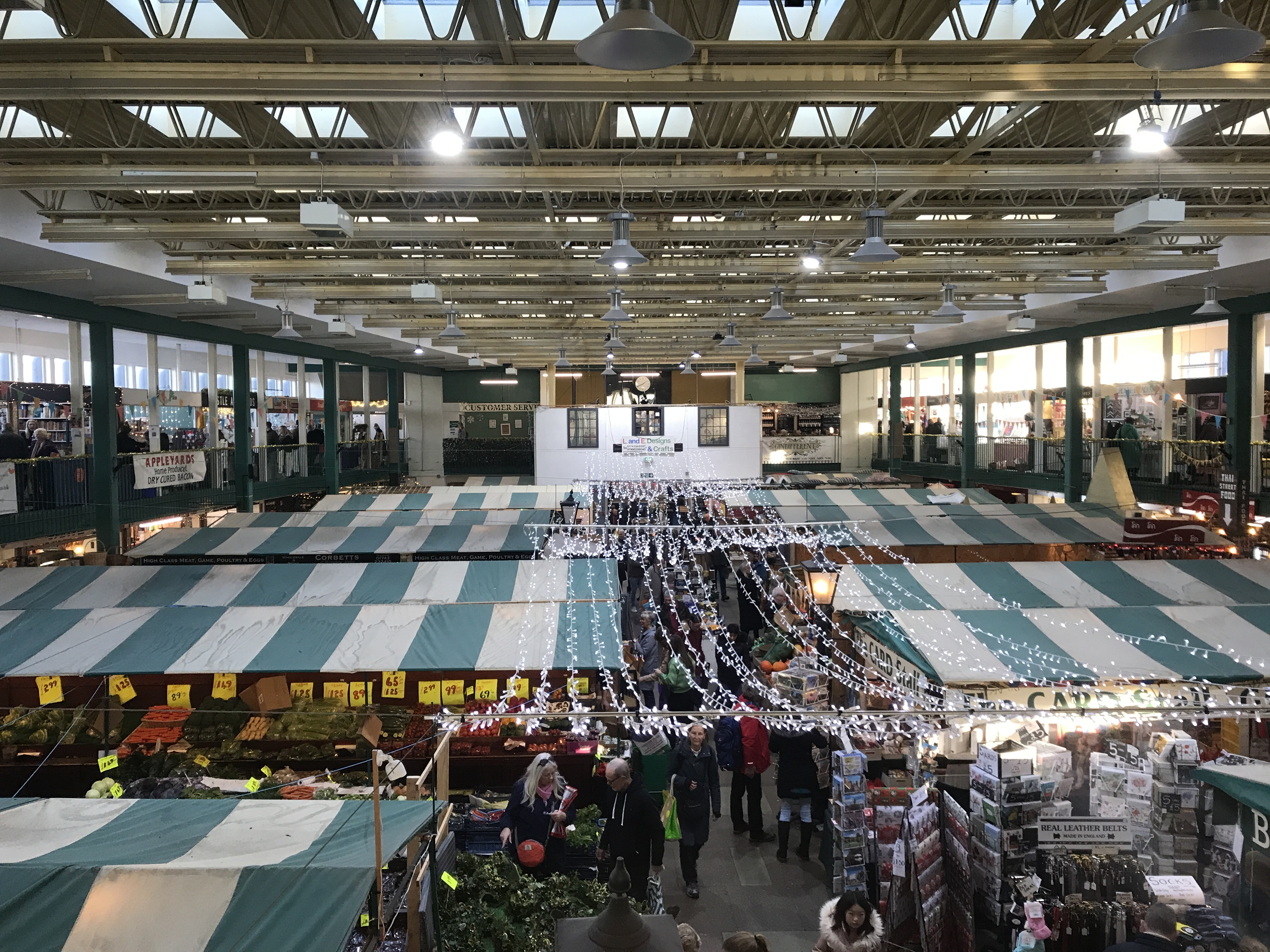
The interior of Shrewsbury Market Hall, which hosts a variety of cafés and restaurants.

Shrewsbury cakes (or biscuits) are typically crisp and brittle creations that may incorporate fruit. They can be small in size for serving several at a time, or large for serving as a dessert in their own right. Traditionally they have a distinct hint of lemon. The playwright William Congreve mentioned Shrewsbury cakes in his play The Way of the World in 1700 as a simile (Witwoud – "Why, brother Wilfull of Salop, you may be as short as a Shrewsbury cake, if you please. But I tell you 'tis not modish to know relations in town"). The recipe is also included in several early cookbooks including The Compleat Cook of 1658. A final reference to the cakes can be seen to this day as the subject of a plaque affixed to a building close to Shrewsbury's town library by the junction of Castle Street and School Gardens. The aforementioned plaque marks the spot where the Shrewsbury Cake's recipe is said to have been pioneered in 1760 by Mr Pailin; a further quote, drawn from Richard Harris Barham's The Ingoldsby Legends, reads:

Oh! Pailin. Prince of Cake Compounders
The mouth liquifies at the very name.

Shrewsbury is the origin of a popular Simnel cake recipe. Different towns had their own recipes and shapes of the Simnel cake. Bury, Devizes and Shrewsbury produced large numbers to their own recipes, but it is the Bury version that became most well known.

The town is alleged to be the origin of Shrewsbury sauce, made from Worcester sauce, red wine and mustard, thickened with flour, which is typically served with lamb. Only known from the 1960s when it appeared in the J. Salmon County Series Cookbooks.

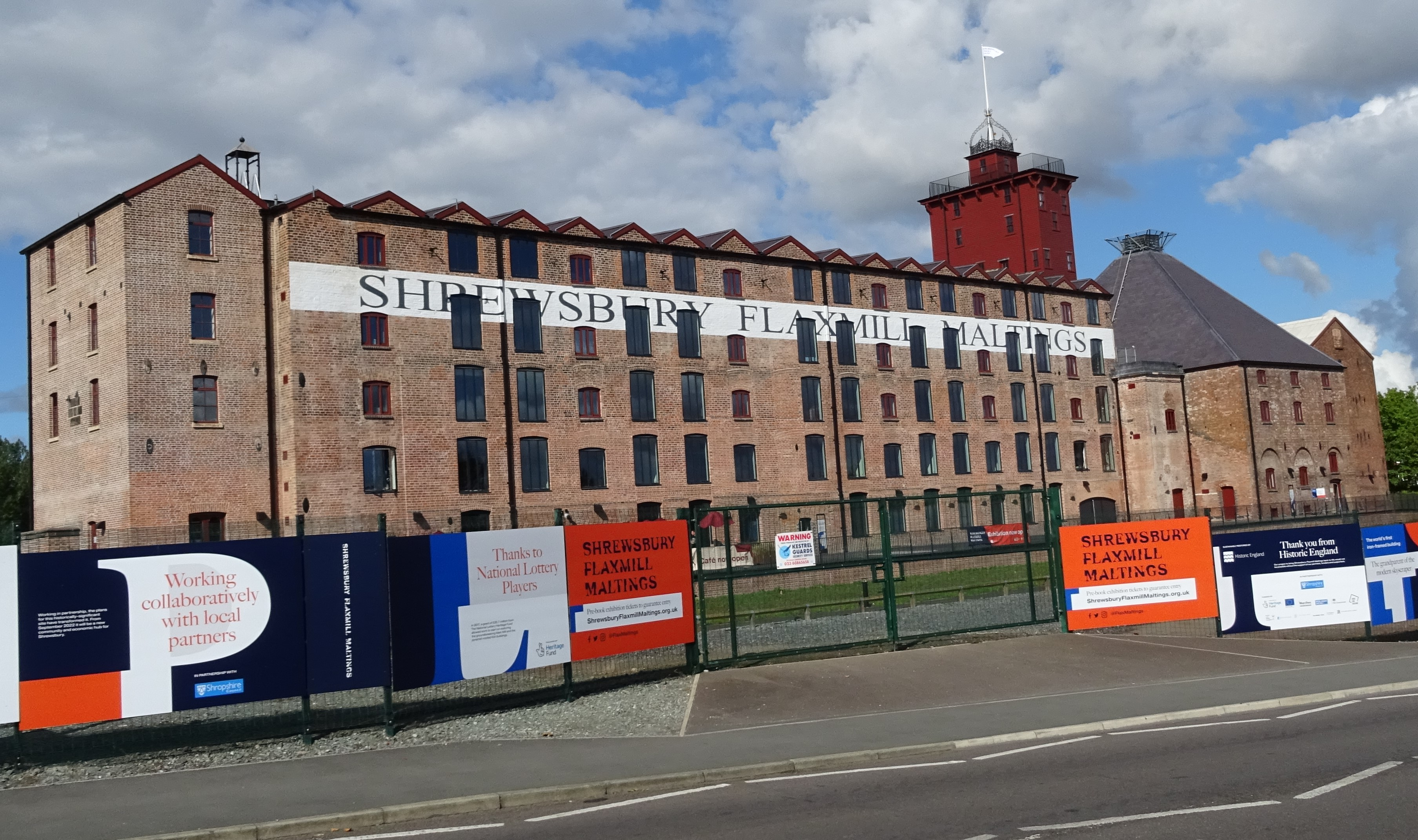
Ditherington Flax Mill

Beer brewed in Shrewsbury was celebrated as early as about 1400 when the bard Iolo Goch praised the supply of "Crwg Amwythig" dispensed at the Sycharth palace of Owain Glyndŵr. In 1900 there were eight breweries in the town, chief among them being Southam's and Trouncer's, which had their own maltings and owned many local public houses, as well as five other maltsters, but the conventional brewing industry gradually closed after takeovers in the 1960s. The last maltings, at Ditherington, closed in 1987. Completed in 1797, these maltings, known as the Ditherington Flax Mill from its original purpose, was the world's first iron-framed building and commonly regarded as "the grandfather of the skyscraper". Its importance was recognised in the 1950s, resulting in it becoming a Grade I listed building. After the biggest heritage project ever undertaken by Historic England, the building was restored and opened as a museum in 2022.

A real ale brewery, The Salopian Brewery, was established in the town in 1995. It was based in the Old Dairy on Mytton Oak Road before relocating in 2014 to Hadnall a few miles north of the town.

== Architecture ==
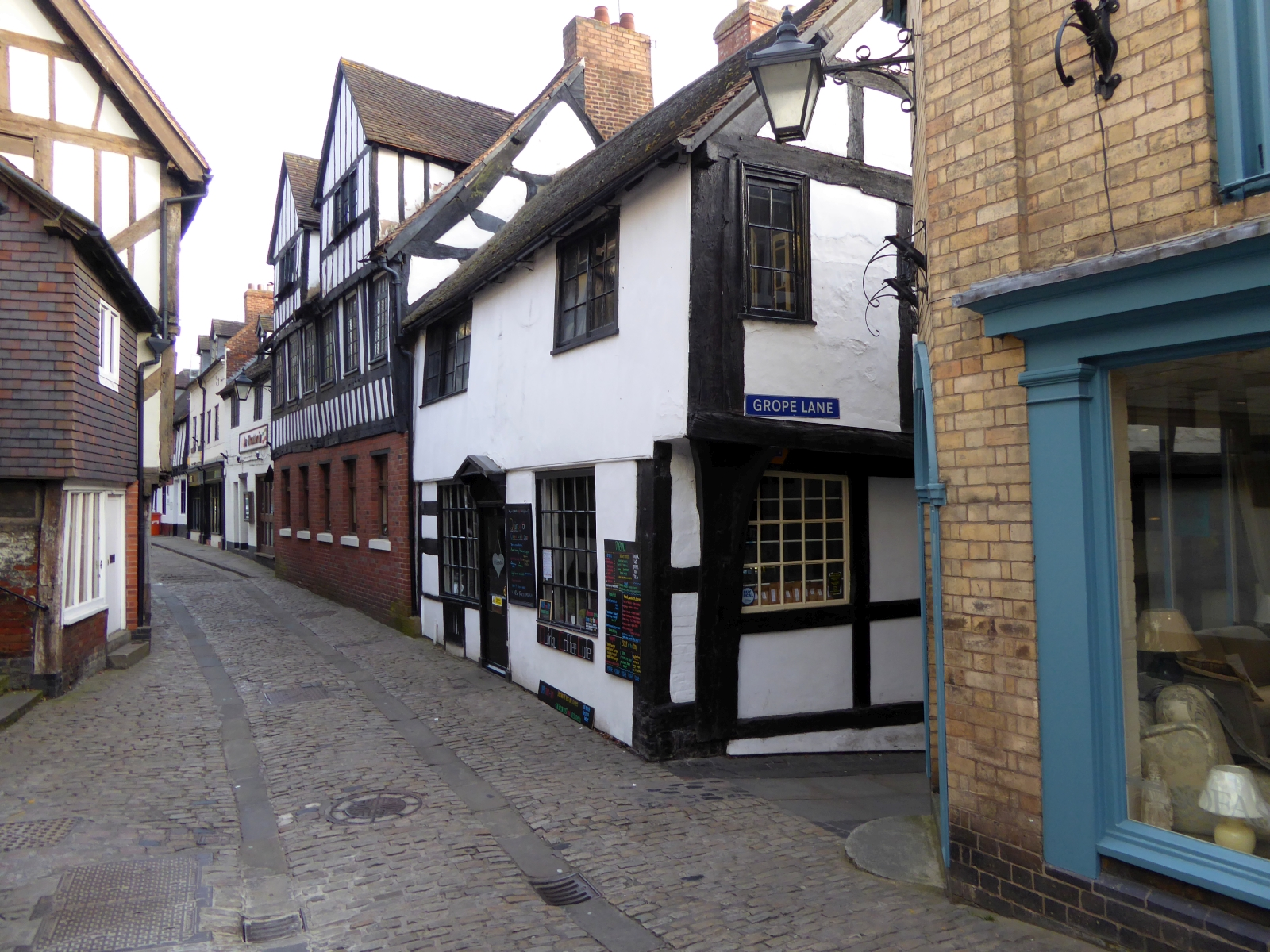
Fish Street and Grope Lane, Shrewsbury

The historic town centre still retains its medieval street pattern and many narrow passages. Some of the passages, especially those that pass through buildings from one street to the next, are called "shuts" (the word deriving from "to shoot through" from one street to another). Many specialist shops, traditional pubs and local restaurants can be found in the hidden corners, squares and lanes of Shrewsbury.

Many of the street names have remained unchanged for centuries and there are some more unusual names, such as Longden Coleham, Dogpole, Mardol, Frankwell, Roushill, Grope Lane, Gullet Passage, Murivance, the Dana, Portobello, Bear Steps, Shoplatch and Bellstone.

The public library, in the pre-1882 Shrewsbury School building, is on Castle Street. Above the main entrance are two statues bearing the Greek inscriptions "Philomathes" and "Polymathes". These portray the virtues "Lover of learning" and "Much learning" to convey the lesson that it is good to gain knowledge through a love of learning.

In the centre of the town lies The Quarry. This 29 acres (12 ha) riverside park attracts thousands of people throughout the year and is enjoyed as a place of recreation. Shrewsbury has traditionally been known as the "Town of Flowers", a slogan incorporated into many of the signs on entrance to the town via major roads, although this was replaced in 2007 with "The birthplace of Charles Darwin".

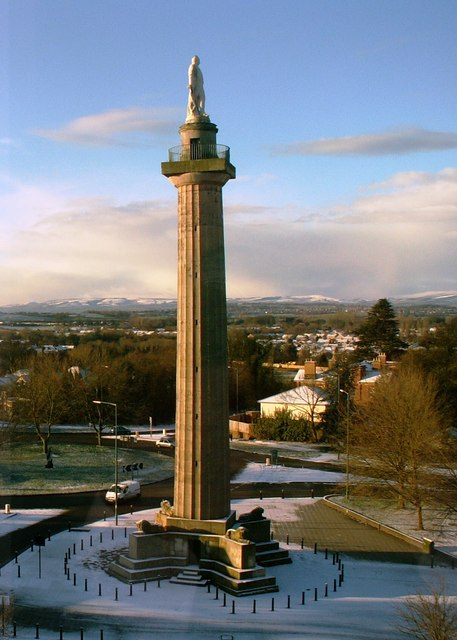
Lord Hill's Column

The British Army's Light Infantry has been associated with Shrewsbury since the 17th century when the first regiments were formed and many more regiments have been raised at Shrewsbury before being deployed all over the world from the American Revolutionary War to the conflicts in Iraq and Afghanistan. Today, after several major reorganisations, the Light Infantry now forms part of the regiment known simply as The Rifles. Shrewsbury's Copthorne Barracks, spiritual home of the Light Division, ultimately housed the Headquarters of the British Army's 143 (West Midlands) Brigade before it moved in 2014, while that of the 5th Division disbanded in April 2012 as part of the reorganisation of the Army's Support Command. Copthorne Barracks was ultimately closed and the site sold in 2018 for residential redevelopment. Under this, the acquired buildings were demolished apart from part of the 19th century 'Keep' which was retained for conversion to apartments. The development has been named Copthorne Keep.

Another notable feature of the town is Lord Hill's Column, sited outside the Shirehall. At 133 ft 6 in (40.7 m) it is the tallest Doric column in England. It was erected as a monument to Rowland Hill commander of II Corps at Waterloo and the man who led the charge against the Imperial Guard towards the end of the battle.

The Quantum Leap is an abstract sculpture unveiled in the town centre in 2009 to mark the bicentenary of the birth of Shrewsbury biologist Charles Darwin.

Shrewsbury's town centre is almost entirely encircled by the River Severn and there are nine bridges across the river. In addition, there are several that cross the Rea Brook. Working downstream, they are in order:

- Frankwell Bridge, a modern pedestrian footbridge which spans the River Severn between Frankwell and the town centre.

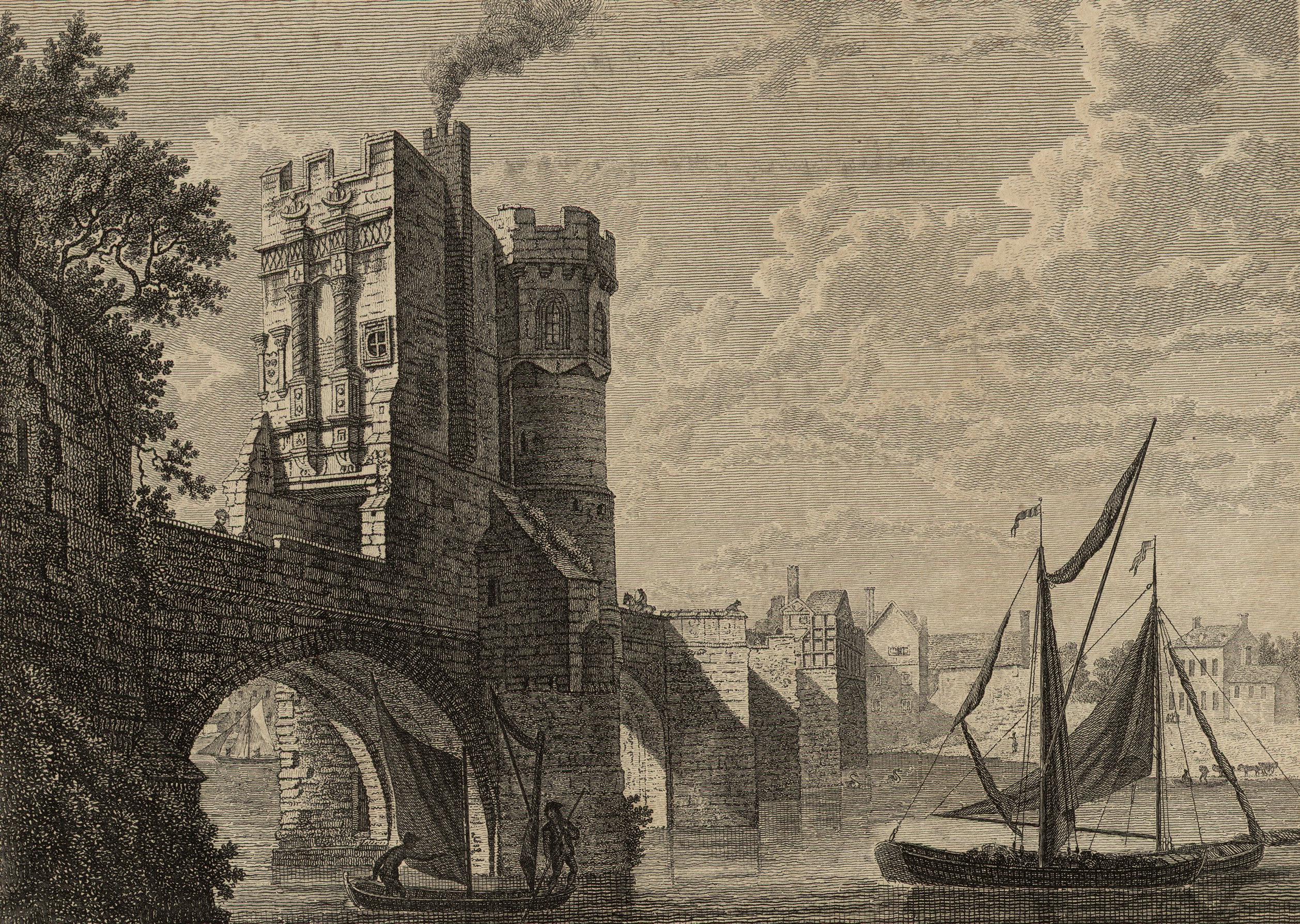
The medieval St George's Bridge, c. 1776

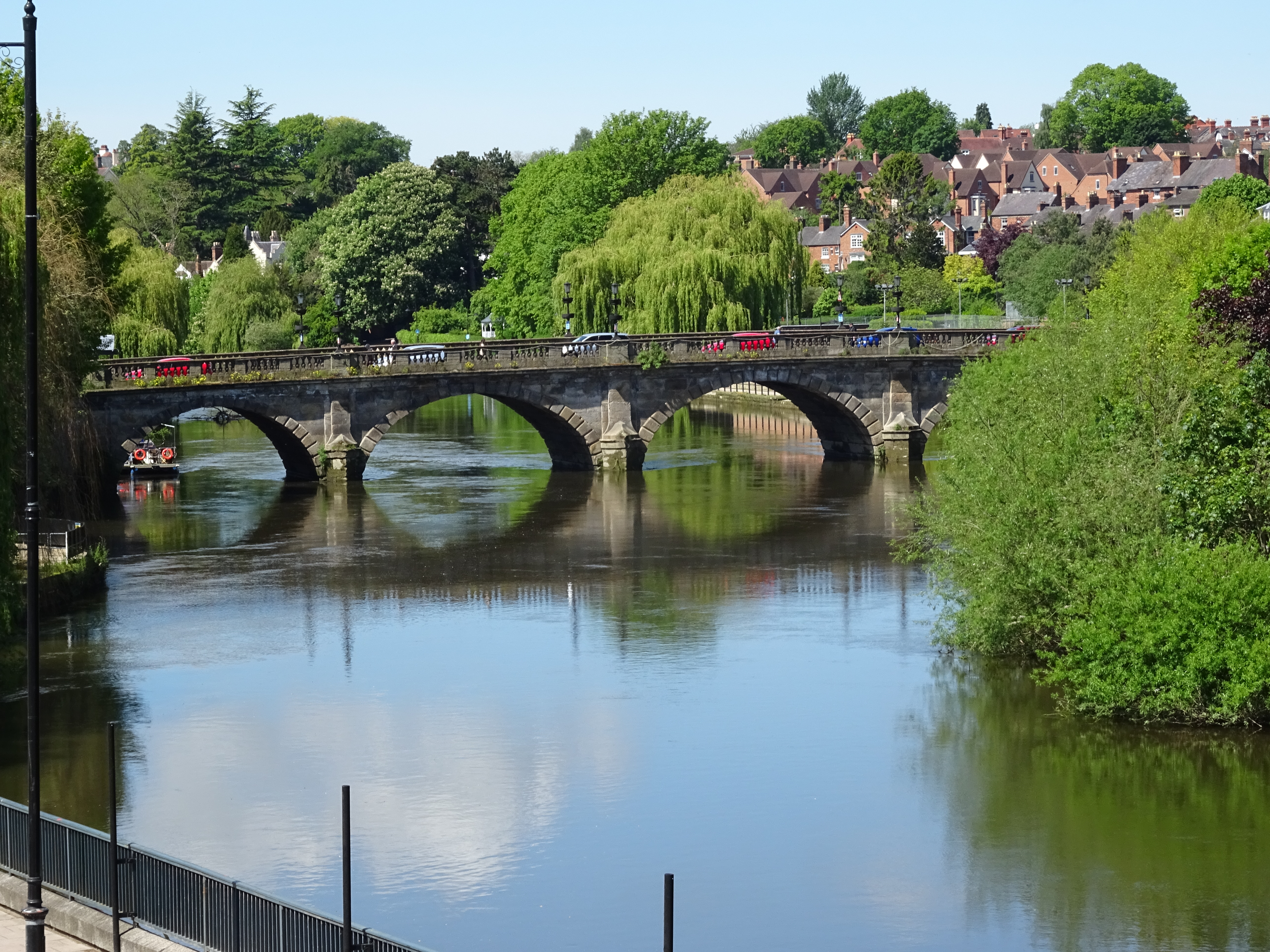
The current Welsh Bridge

- The Welsh Bridge, which was built in 1793–95 to replace the medieval St George's Bridge; featured in Thomas Pennant's A Tour through Wales published in 1781. The old bridge was sketched by J. M. W. Turner in 1794 as the basis for a later water colour painting.
- Further along from the Welsh Bridge is the Porthill Bridge, a pedestrian suspension bridge running between the Quarry and Porthill, built in 1922.

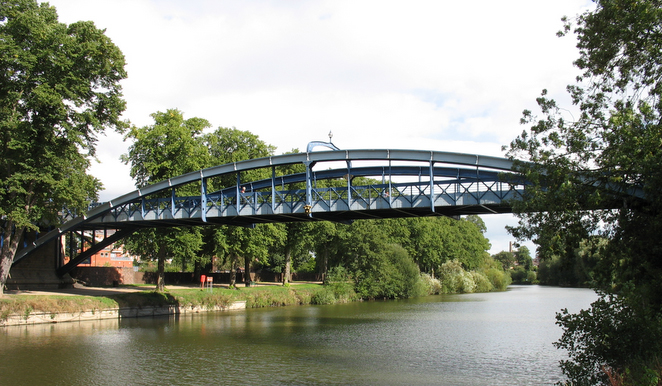
Kingsland Bridge, the town's only toll bridge

- The next bridge along the river is Kingsland Bridge, a privately owned toll bridge.
- The subsequent bridge is the Greyfriars Bridge, a pedestrian bridge between Coleham and the town centre.

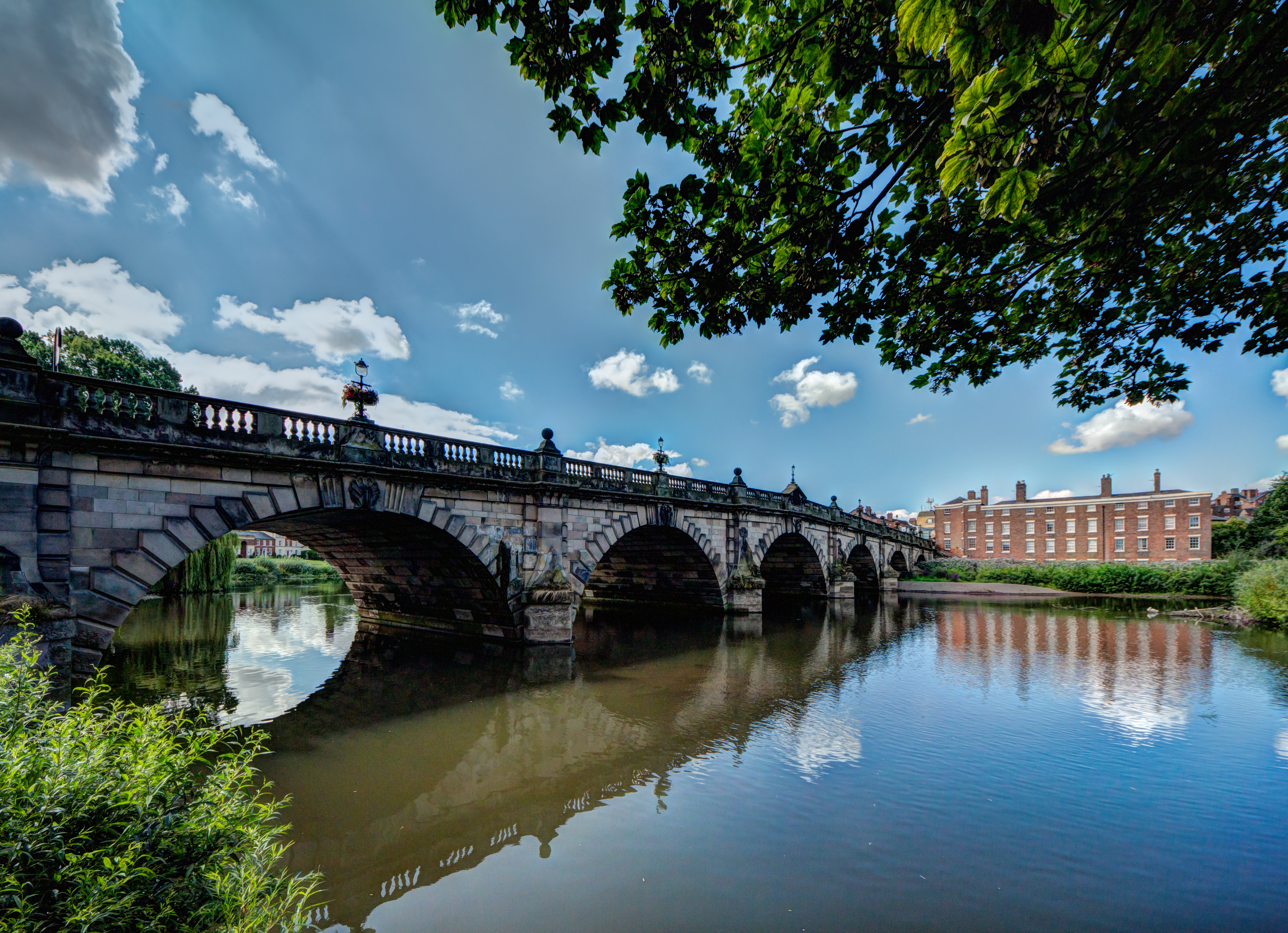
The English Bridge

- Following the Greyfriars Bridge is the English Bridge, historically called Stone Bridge, which was rebuilt in the 1920s. The bridge was also sketched by Turner.
- Beyond it is the railway station, which is partly built over the river.
- After the station is Castle Walk Footbridge, another modern pedestrian footbridge.
- The last bridge to cross the river within the Shrewsbury bypass area is the A5112 Telford Way, which has separate lanes for vehicles, bicycles and pedestrians.

A. E. Housman wrote of the area in A Shropshire Lad, which mentions the bridges of the town in part XXVIII: The Welsh Marches.

High the vanes of Shrewsbury gleam
Islanded in Severn stream;
The bridges from the steepled crest,
Cross the water east and west.

== Transport ==
=== Railway ===
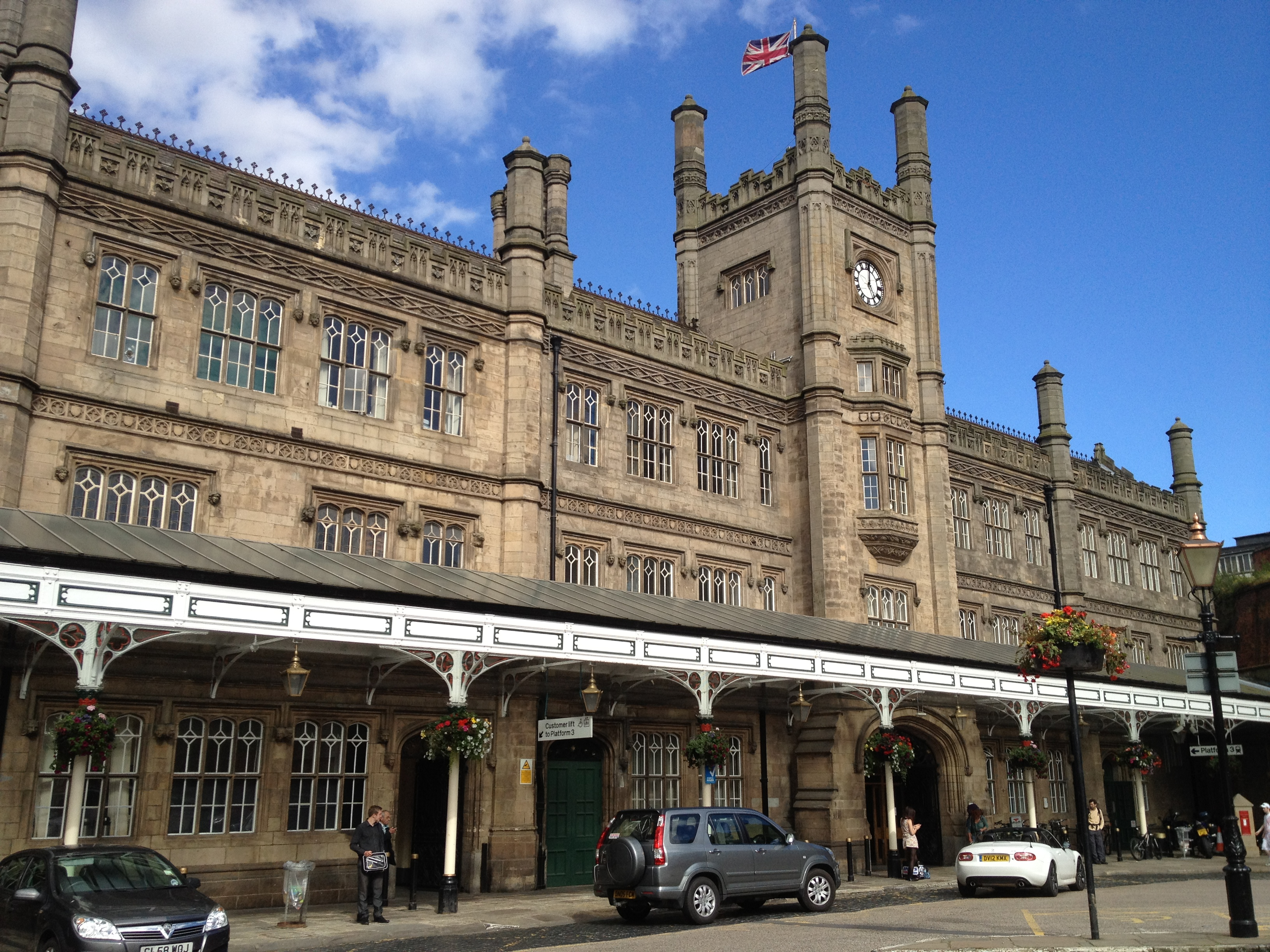
The main station building

Shrewsbury railway station is served by two train operating companies:

- Transport for Wales Rail operates services running north to Wrexham General, Crewe, Chester and Manchester Piccadilly; southbound trains go to Hereford, Cardiff Central and Swansea; and westbound to Aberystwyth
- West Midlands Trains run services to Birmingham New Street, via Telford and Wolverhampton

The main railway station building was built in a mock Tudor architectural style; it includes a clock tower, imitation Tudor chimneys and carved heads in the frames of every window and is Grade II listed. There is a small British Transport Police station within the building. The station is known as the Gateway to Wales.

Shrewsbury Abbey was the terminus of the Shropshire and Montgomeryshire Railway, which connected Shrewsbury with Llanymynech. Shrewsbury West was the railway's other station in the town. The line and the stations closed in 1960. Abbey Foregate was built by the Shrewsbury and Birmingham Railway and closed in 1912.

=== Buses ===
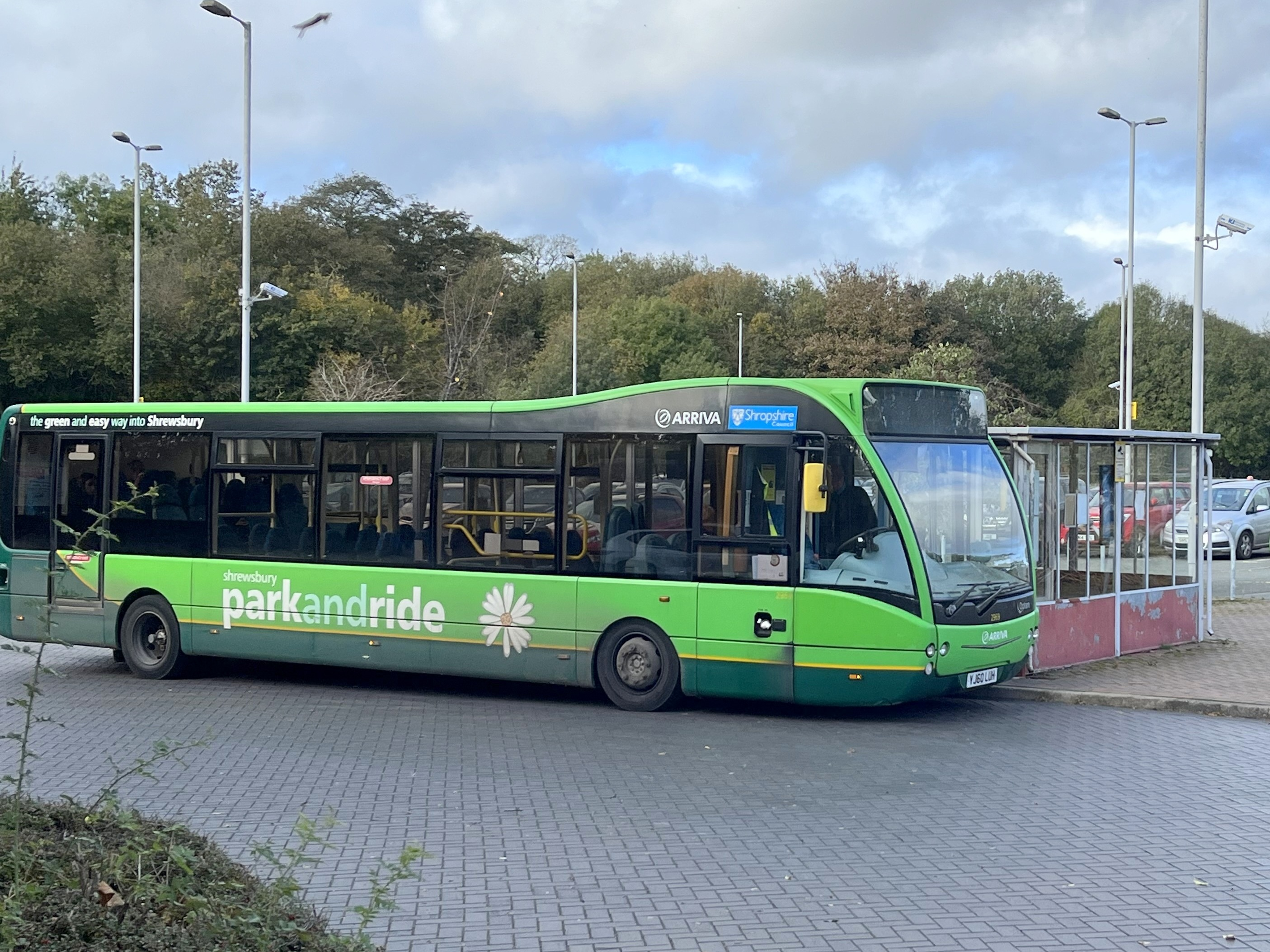
An Arriva park & ride bus at the Oxon site in November 2023

Bus services in the town are operated primarily by Arriva Midlands and D&G under its Hotspur brand; routes are centred around Shrewsbury bus station, adjacent to the Darwin Shopping Centre, and is a short walk from the railway station. Arriva also operate county services both independently and on behalf of Shropshire Council. Key routes connect the town with Telford, Market Drayton and Newport.

There are other bus companies operating around the Shrewsbury area, including Boultons of Shropshire, Minsterley Motors and Tanat Valley Coaches with the latter operating services across the Welsh border from nearby towns including Llanfyllin and Welshpool.

Shrewsbury has a park & ride bus scheme in operation, with three car parks on the edge of town; these are at Harlescott (to the north, colour-coded blue), Oxon (to the west, colour-coded pink) and Meole Brace (to the south, colour-coded green).

=== Road ===
A map of Shrewsbury showing suburbs, surrounding villages, rivers (blue), roads (red) and rail routes (green)

Shrewsbury has been an important centre for road traffic. In 1815, Thomas Telford designed a new coaching route from London to Holyhead in order to improve communications with Ireland. He routed the new road via Shrewsbury, which opened in 1830. The road is now the A5. The road connects the town north-west to Oswestry and east towards Telford, where it joins the M54. The A5 once ran through the town centre, until a bypass was built in the 1930s. Subsequently, in 1992, a 17-mile (27 km) dual carriageway was completed at a cost of £79 million to the south of the town and was made to form part of the A5 route. This dual carriageway was built further out of the town to act as a substantial link to Telford, as well as a bypass for the town.

The A49 goes to Shrewsbury, joining the A5 at the south of the town, coming from Ludlow and Leominster. At this point, the road merges with the A5 for 3 miles (4.8 km), before separating again to the east of the town. From there it runs north, passing Sundorne, then Battlefield, before heading out towards Whitchurch. At Battlefield, the A53 route begins and heads north-east towards Shawbury and Market Drayton, then onwards towards Newcastle-under-Lyme and Stoke-on-Trent.

The A458 (Mallwyd-Quinton) runs through the town centre, entering in the west and leaving to the south-east. The A528 begins in the town centre and heads north, heading for Ellesmere. The A488 begins just west of the town centre in Frankwell and heads out to Bishop's Castle, Clun and Knighton crossing the border in the southwest of Shropshire.

Major roads within the town include the A5112, A5191 and A5064. The A5191 goes north–south via the town centre, while the A5112 runs north–south to the east of the town centre. The A5064 is a short, one mile (1.6 km) stretch of road to the south-east of the town centre, called London Road. Additionally, the A5124, the most recent bypass, was completed in 1998 and runs across the northern edge of the town at Battlefield (connecting the A49/A53 to the A528), though it did exist before as Harlescott Lane (which has since become unclassified).

Construction of a major new artery, referred to as the North West Relief Road (NWRR), was granted central government funding in April 2019. Together with the existing A5 and A49 by-passes, the Battlefield Link Road (A5124) and the Oxon Link Road; this would result in the completion of the ring road around the outskirts of the town. The NWRR would involve the construction of a new bridge over the River Severn, upstream from the town centre. Construction was expected to be completed by 2026. However, the project was paused in 2025 following the election of a Liberal Democrat majority in the Shropshire Council election that year and was reported to have been officially scrapped in February 2026.

=== Cycling ===
Shrewsbury has a comprehensive network of on-road and traffic-free cycle routes. In 2008, the town was awarded Cycling Town status by Cycling England; as a result, it benefited from £1.8 million of grant funding from the Department for Transport between 2008 and 2011. The funding was used to make improvements to the cycle network in Shrewsbury and to provide cycle training, information and advice to people to help encourage them to cycle to school and work.

== Education ==
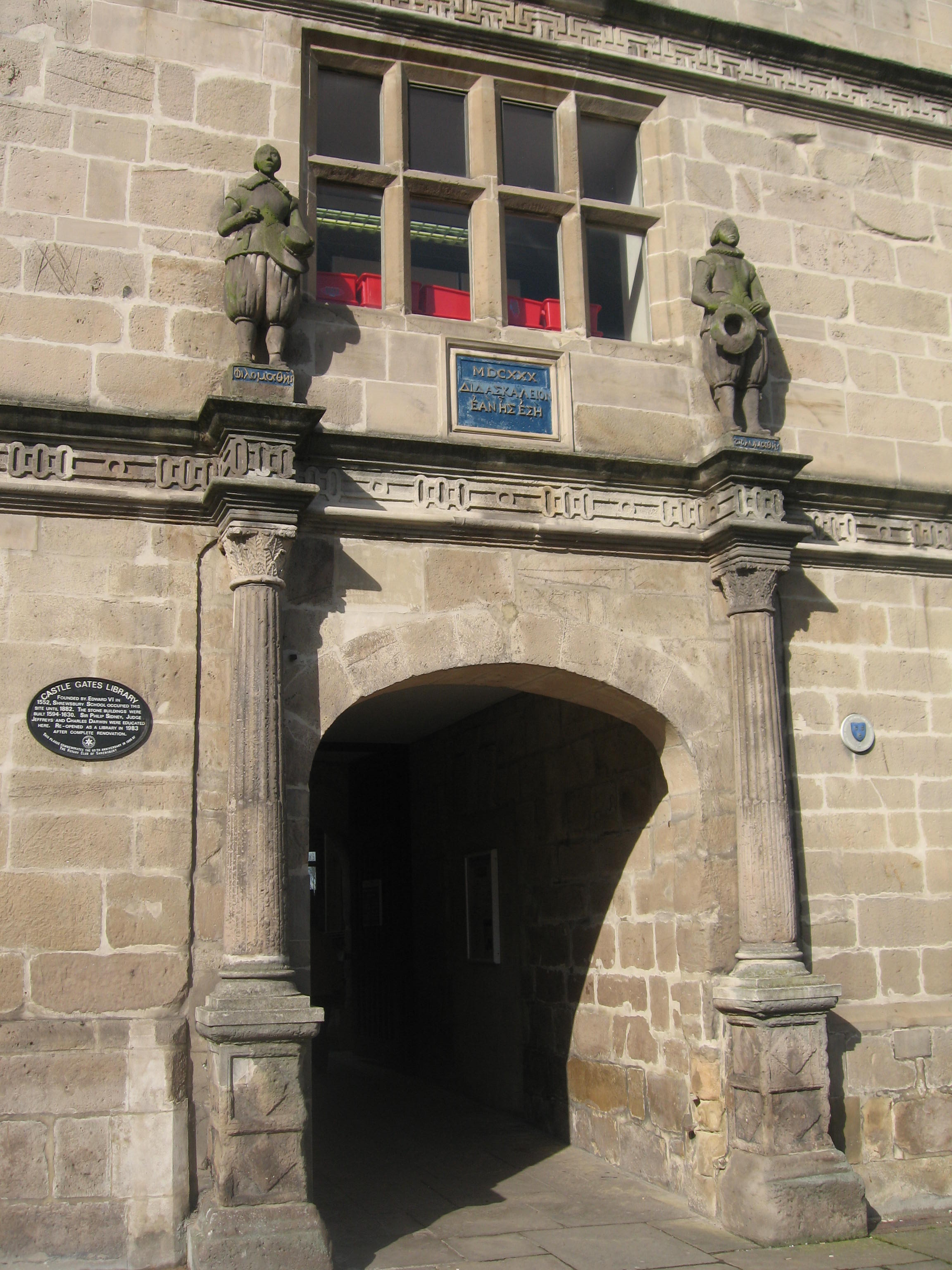
Shrewsbury Library, Castle Gates; formerly Shrewsbury School

Prior to the reformation, Shrewsbury Abbey and the Collegiate Churches of St Mary (established by King Edgar in the 10th century) and St Chad (established in the 13th) were providing education in the town. Remains of the college of St Chad can be traced in the land adjoining the south-western extremity of the church on the old site, with portions of the wall traceable to a considerable distance in the neighbouring gardens. These were closed by the dissolutions. There is mention of a grammar school at Shrewsbury in a court case of 1439.

An effort was made to found a university in the 1600s during the Commonwealth which followed the execution of Charles I. Richard Baxter, a puritan minister from Shropshire, suggested the establishment of a university for Wales at Shrewsbury in the belief that he could obtain the support of Cromwell and Parliament for the scheme.

=== Independent sector ===
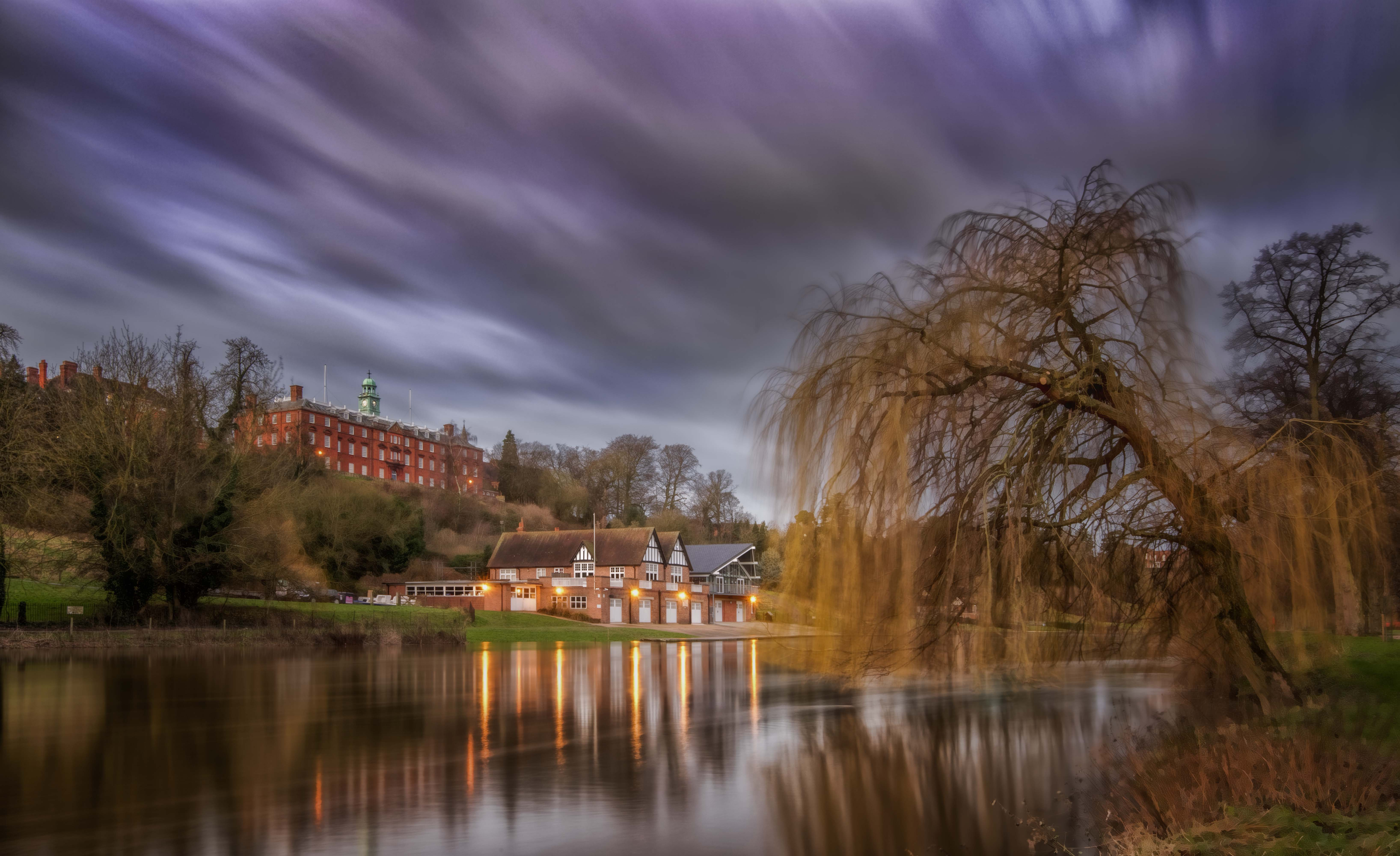
Shrewsbury School's main building on the site it moved to in 1882 was built c. 1765

Shrewsbury School is a public school, on a large site in Kingsland, just south of the town centre overlooking the loop of the Severn. The school was located in the town centre between 1552 and 1882. The buildings it formerly occupied then are now occupied by the main county library on Castle Street. Opposite it on the other side of the river is Shrewsbury High School, an independent girls' day school.

Prestfelde School is an independent preparatory school, on London Road, close to the Lord Hill's Column. As part of the Woodard Schools group, it is affiliated to the largest group of Church of England schools in the country. Whilst originally a school for boys it started accepting girls between the ages of three and thirteen. The school is set in 30 acres (12 ha) of grounds on the outskirts of the town.

The town's other long-established boys' preparatory school is Kingsland Grange, on Old Roman Road in Kingsland. In 2007, it merged with the junior department of Shrewsbury Girls' High School, sharing the two sites with some classes remaining single sex, but others switching to a co-educational format.

=== State sector ===
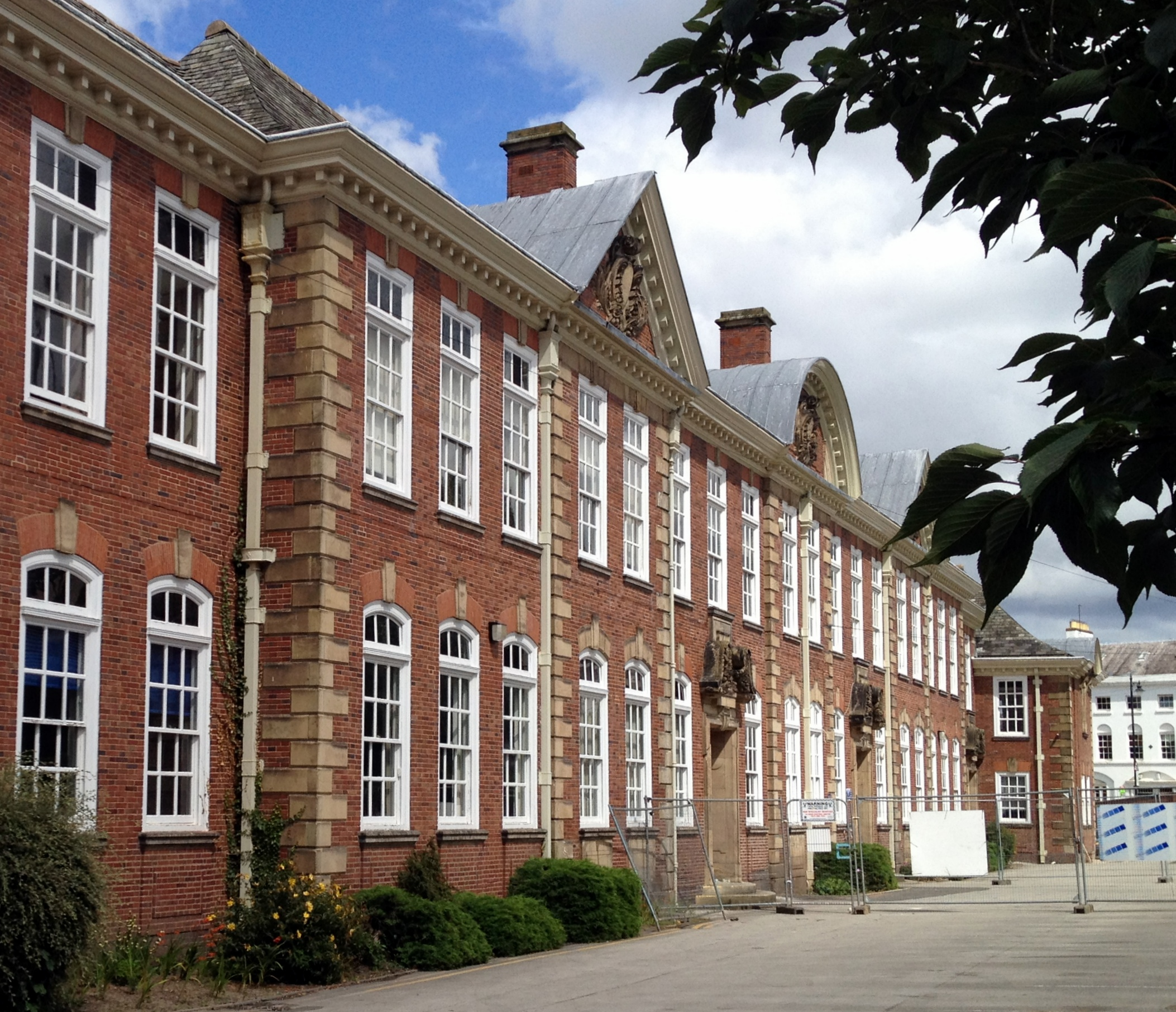
The Main Grade II listed building of Shrewsbury Sixth Form College, built circa 1910

The majority of the town's pupils attend one of the several comprehensive schools. The Priory School, formerly a grammar school for girls; Meole Brace School, The Grange School, Sundorne School and Belvidere School. In 2016, The Grange and Sundorne schools were amalgamated to form Shrewsbury Academy. The school has two campuses; however, it is planned in the next few years for all pupils to move to the Corndon Crescent site of the former Sundorne School.

The Wakeman School, which was geographically the closest school to the town centre 'loop', next to the English Bridge, was previously the Shrewsbury Technical School and was attended by the First World War poet Wilfred Owen. It closed as part of reorganisation in July 2013. The site is now utilised by the Shrewsbury Colleges Group.

Further education is provided by Shrewsbury Sixth Form College, previously the Priory School for Boys, ranked 17th in the top 20 of sixth form colleges nationally by the Sunday Times newspaper in November 2012, and Shrewsbury College, which handles primarily vocational courses. In 2016, the two establishments were merged into the Shrewsbury Colleges Group.

=== University ===
University Centre Shrewsbury has been offering postgraduate courses since autumn 2014 and undergraduate courses from autumn 2015. It was established by the University of Chester and Shropshire Council. The main campus is located in the renovated Guildhall.

== Religious sites ==
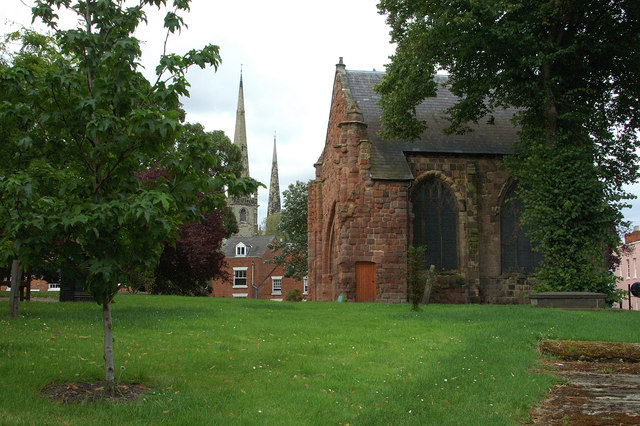
Ruins of Old St Chad's

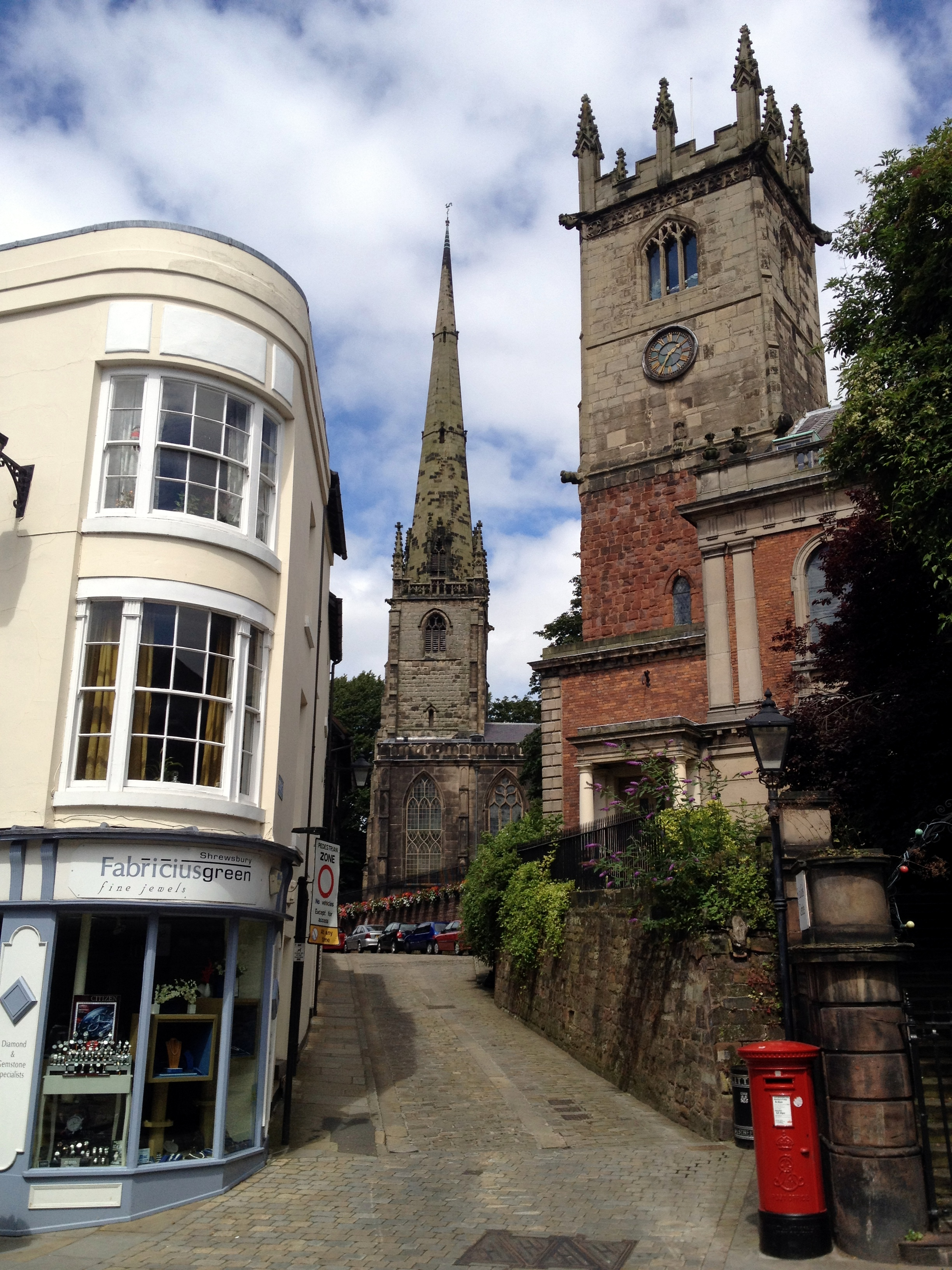
The spire of St Alkmund's Church and the tower of St Julian's Church

There are two Anglo-Saxon foundations of collegiate churches: that of St Chad, since resited after the collapse of the original church and rebuilt in 1792 and St Mary, replaced by what is described as the most complete medieval church in Shrewsbury, dating back to the 12th century. The Norman Shrewsbury Abbey was founded in 1083 and its nave survived as a parish church following the dissolution.

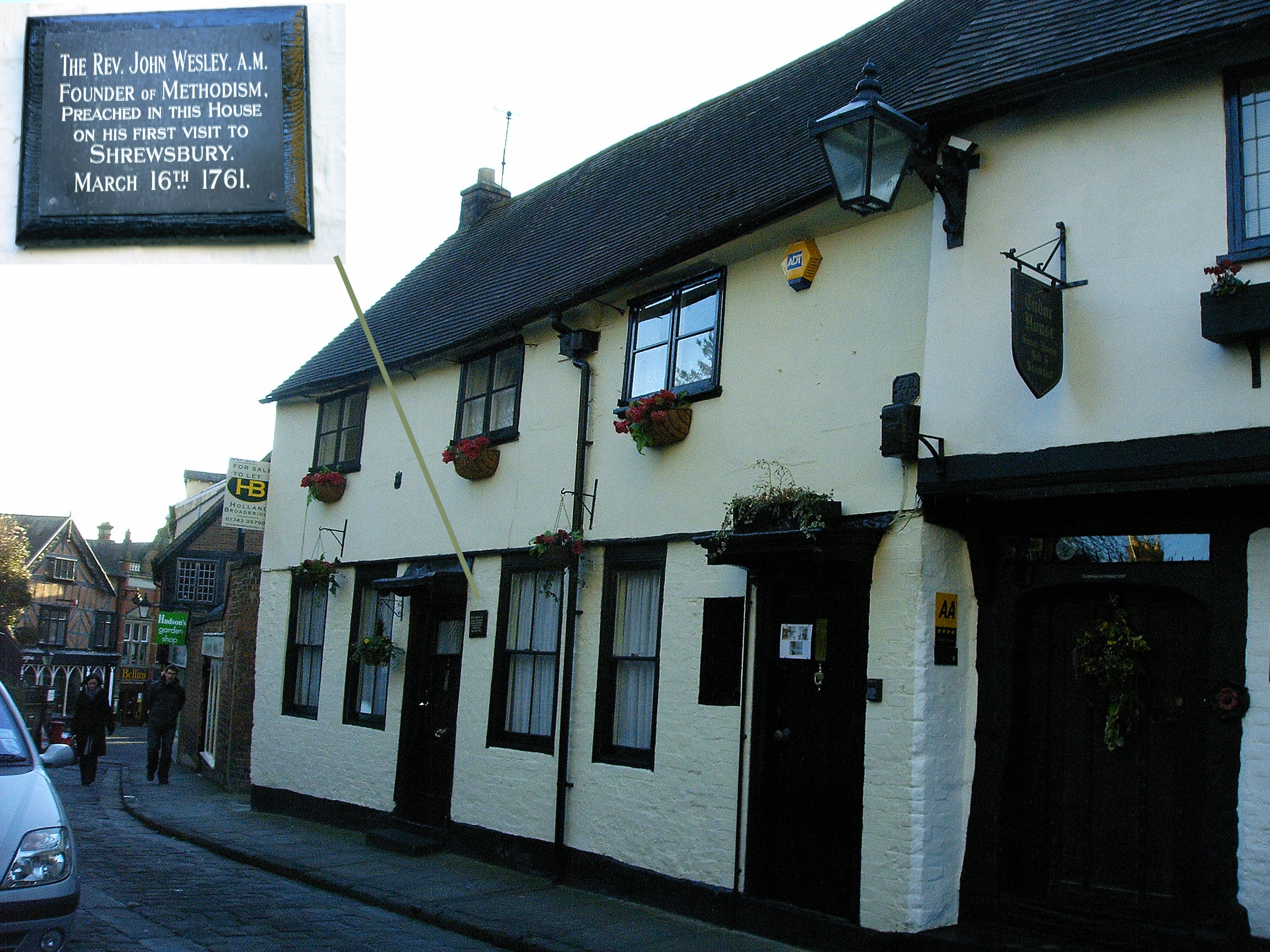
John Wesley first preached here.

According to legend, the spire of St Alkmund's Church was damaged by the Devil in 1553 and climbed four times by a drunken steeplejack in 1621.

There are a number of other Anglican churches in Shrewsbury: Shrewsbury All Saints in Castlefields, The Church of the Holy Spirit in Harlescott, Holy Trinity, St George of Cappadocia, St Giles, Greenfields United Church and St Peter in Monkmoor.

Methodists, Baptists and the United Reformed Church are also represented, alongside newer church groups including Elim Pentecostal and two Newfrontiers. Shrewsbury Evangelical Church met in the former Anglican parish church of St Julian, which was previously a craft centre, at the Wyle Cop end of Fish Street, later moving into the Springfield estate in the eastern suburbs meeting at the Mereside Community Centre. One of the houses in Fish Street, facing St Alkmund's Church, was the site of John Wesley's first preaching in Shrewsbury; a wall plaque records the date as 16 March 1761. The Grade II listed Shrewsbury Unitarian Church was founded in 1662 according to the inscription above the main door. The current building was built between 1839 and 1840.

Shrewsbury has a Roman Catholic Cathedral, by the Town Walls. Designed by Edward Pugin after the death of his father, Augustus, it was consecrated in 1856. There are two other parishes, in Harlescott and Monkmoor, within the Roman Catholic Diocese of Shrewsbury.

Shrewsbury's Greek Orthodox Church, a former Anglican church building, is at Dove Close off Oteley Road to the south. The site of which had been used as a place of worship for some four thousand years. The building, dating from the 13th century, was purchased by the Orthodox church in the 1990s after being disused for services since the 1950s and restored, as the Church of the 318 Holy Fathers, with funds from English Heritage. Regular Sunday services are now conducted at St Julian's Centre, which is privately owned, owing to the need for a larger venue although weekday services continue at the Church of the 318 Holy Fathers.

Shrewsbury's first known dedicated non-Christian place of worship, a Muslim prayer centre, was approved in 2013. It is in the Column Lodge, the former registry office in Preston Street. Before then, the local Muslim community had been hosted by the United Reformed Church on English Bridge.

=== Community and charity projects ===
Many community projects in Shrewsbury are based in, or have been started by local churches, including the Isaiah 58 project, which is the primary work amongst homeless people in the town, whilst 'Churches Together in Shrewsbury' works to help homeless people through the Shrewsbury Ark project.

Shrewsbury Food Bank, based at Barnabas Community Church Centre and part of 'Food Bank PLUS,' provides a wide range of social action initiatives including 'Money Advice' (a confidential, not for profit debt, benefits and financial help service) and Eclipse Child Bereavement, which works with local schools to help children who have experienced losses to overcome their situation. Also run by Barnabas are projects including '360 Journey to Work,' which help people gain skills in applying for jobs including basics like CV writing. 'Cage football' is an initiative that is lent out to local community groups, youth clubs and other churches.

== Sport ==
=== Football ===
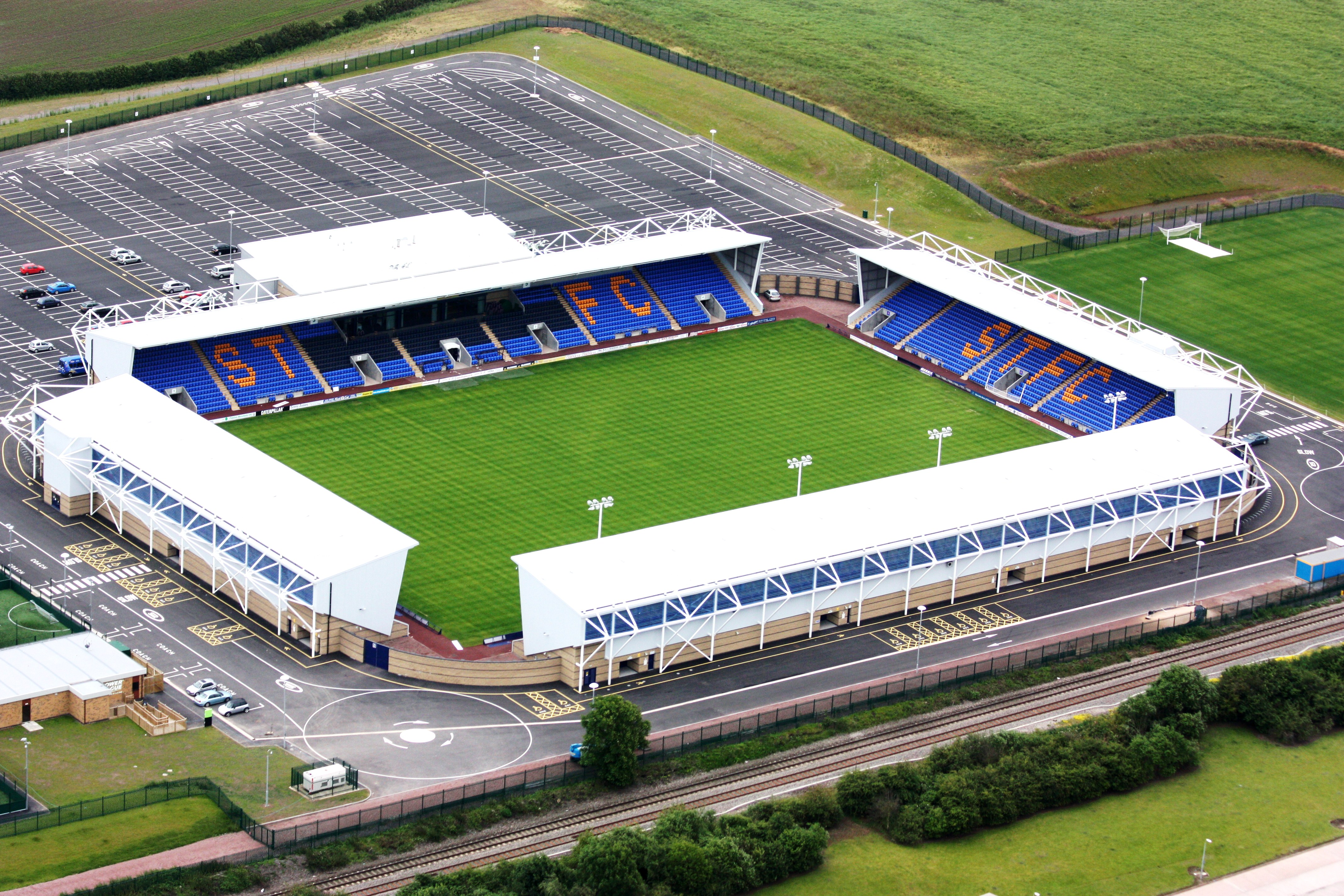
New Meadow stadium, home of Shrewsbury Town

The town has a claim on the emergence of the formally codified game of association football via Shrewsbury School which published a set of ten rules in about 1856, agreed with Eton, Harrow and Rugby schools and Cambridge University. This predated the Football Association's initial rule book by seven years.

Shrewsbury is home to a professional football club, Shrewsbury Town. As of March 2026, they compete in EFL League Two and since 2007 has played their home games at New Meadow – from 1910 to 2007 the club played at the Gay Meadow stadium. The town is also home to a semi-professional football club, Haughmond, who take their name from the nearby Haughmond Hill. They currently compete in the Shropshire County League Premier Division and play their home games at the Shrewsbury Sports Village, in Sundorne.

=== Rowing ===
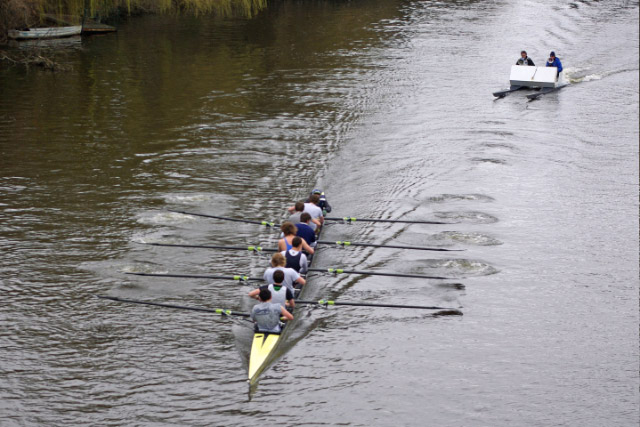
An eight rowing on the Severn in Shrewsbury

The River Severn in the town is used for rowing by both the Pengwern Boat Club, founded in 1871 and using an ancient name for the town, and the Royal Shrewsbury School Boat Club (RSSBC), founded in 1866. The Pengwern brick and timber club house was built in 1881 and is a Grade II listed building. The club house was expanded around 2013. More recently, the two clubs have been joined by students of Harper Adams University, University Centre Shrewsbury and crews from other local schools.

There is an annual rowing regatta in the town in May. It is one of the oldest events in the rowing calendar, having first been held in 1871. A head of the river race was run annually between 1936 and the 1990s.

=== Rugby ===
There is a local rugby club, Shrewsbury Rugby Club.

=== Motor sports ===
The local motorsports heritage includes the Loton Park Hillclimb and Hawkstone Park Motocross Circuit near Shrewsbury. Shrewsbury Motocross Club has staged motocross events in the area for over 30 years.

=== Other sports ===
Shrewsbury Sports Village is a sports centre in the Sundorne district of the town, aimed at providing a wide range of sports facilities for townspeople. There are a number of golf facilities, including Meole Brace Municipal Golf Course, in the area. Shrewsbury holds its own annual Sprint Triathlon, which takes place each September at the Shropshire Agricultural Showground, organised by SYTri (Shrewsbury Triathlon Club) which is affiliated to the British Triathlon Federation. A free weekly parkrun takes place in the Quarry.

== Notable Salopians ==
There have been a number of notable Salopians, including Charles Darwin, the biologist and evolutionary theorist. Darwin, one of the most important thinkers of the 19th century, was born in Shrewsbury on 12 February 1809 at the Mount House, baptised at St Chad's Church and educated at Shrewsbury School. The town's river and proximity to the countryside inspired his interest in the natural world, while its abundant ice-age boulders sparked his interest in geology. Classicist Mary Beard, (born 1955) Cambridge professor and television presenter, was educated in Shrewsbury where her father was a prominent architect.

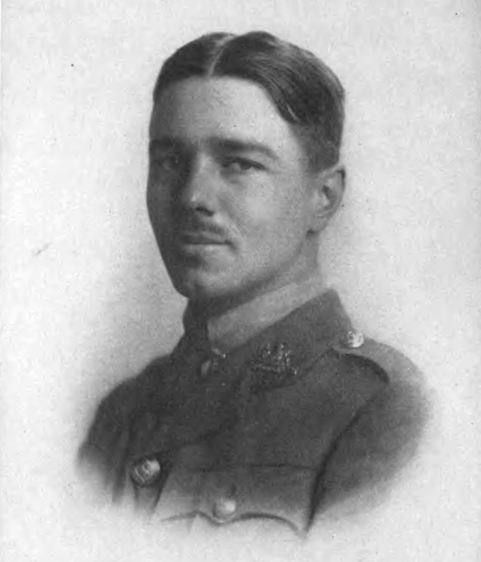
Wilfred Owen

Shrewsbury has been home to many contributors to literature. Thomas Churchyard (c. 1523–1604) son of a farmer, was an author of autobiographical or semi-autobiographical verse collections. In the early years of the 18th century, the Irish dramatist George Farquhar, (1677–1707) resided in the town while serving as a recruiting officer for the Army. He drew on this experience in writing the comedy The Recruiting Officer. The romantic novelist Mary Webb, (1881–1927) lived in and around outer Shrewsbury and was buried there upon her death. Before the First World War, the poet Wilfred Owen, (1893–1918) lived in the town and there is a memorial to Owen at Shrewsbury Abbey. Comedian George Robey, (1869–1954) lived in the town, near Lord Hill's Column, before and during the Second World War. The contemporary poet, Jemma L. King is from Shrewsbury.

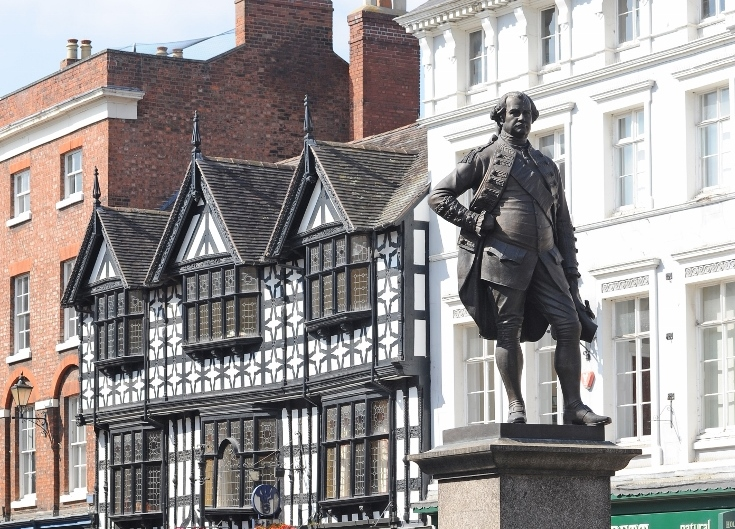
Statue of Robert Clive

Politicians with connections with the town include Sir William Pulteney, 5th Baronet, (1729–1805) once Britain's richest man, he was MP for Shrewsbury from 1768 to 1805. He lived in apartments at Shrewsbury Castle. Robert Clive, (1725–1774), was MP for Shrewsbury and also the mayor. Leo Blair, (1923–2012) the father of former Prime Minister Tony Blair, (born 1953) was a resident of the town.

Ian Hunter, (born 1939) the lead singer of the 1970s pop group Mott the Hoople, was a resident of 23a Swan Hill in the town centre and wrote a song of the same name. The 1980s pop group T'Pau was formed in the town and the band's vocalist Carol Decker, (born 1957) has lived in the town, along with other members of the band. Notable music historian and composer Charles Burney, (1726–1814) was born and educated in the town. Lange, (born 1974), a DJ and dance music producer, was born in Shrewsbury.

Sporting Salopians include four FA Cup Final winning players who took part in the first decade of the Cup's history and were born in or lived in Shrewsbury: John Hawley Edwards, (1850–1893), Henry Wace, (1853–1947) and John Wylie, (1854–1924) of the Wanderers and Clopton Lloyd-Jones, (1858–1918) of Clapham Rovers. Arthur Rowley, (1926–2002), the Football League's highest scoring player, settled in Shrewsbury, having first come to the town as a Shrewsbury Town player, where he died in 2002. More recent players are Danny Guthrie, (born 1987) of Newcastle United, Shrewsbury Town youth academy graduate and England goalkeeper Joe Hart, (born 1987) and Wales midfielder David Edwards, (born 1986) were born in the town, as was Sheffield Wednesday and Scotland striker Steven Fletcher, (born 1987) whose serviceman father was stationed there. Sandy Lyle, (born 1958) a professional golfer, was born in the town. Neville Cardus, (1888– 1975) spent some of his formative years as assistant cricket coach at Shrewsbury School.

Other notable people of the town include; John Gwynn, (1713–1786) an 18th-century architect, who designed the English Bridge and the bridge at Atcham, was born in the town; the Anglo-Scottish suffragette Barbara Wylie, (1861–1954) was born in Shrewsbury; comic book artist Charlie Adlard, (born 1966) was born in Shrewsbury and is known for illustrating The Walking Dead; Robert Cadman, (1711–1739) a performer and steeplejack, is buried in the town, at St Mary's Church; Simon Gosling, (born 1969) a visual effects designer, was born in the town and was resident there until 1994; Percy Thrower, (1913–1988) the gardener and broadcaster lived in Shrewsbury, where he set up the garden centre near Meole Brace just down the road from the football club. Justin Pearson, (born 1971) an award-winning stunt performer and stunt coordinator currently lives in the town. Hugo Botstiber, (1875–1941) Austrian musicologist, died at Cotonhurst on 15 January 1941 only a few months after arriving in Shrewsbury. Being of Jewish origin, he had emigrated from Vienna in 1938.

Flight Lieutenant Eric Lock, (1919–1941) was born in nearby Bayston Hill and was educated at Prestfelde preparatory school on London Road. Lock became internationally recognised as a high scoring fighter ace of the Royal Air Force in the Second World War with 26 victories before his death in combat at the age of 21. He was the RAF's most successful British-born pilot in the Battle of Britain. One Victoria Cross recipient is known to have lived in Shrewsbury; Arthur Herbert Procter, (1890–1973) who was decorated in 1916 during World War I and retired from his later full-time clergy ministry in 1964 to briefly live at Mytton Oak Road, Copthorne, before relocating to Sheffield.

== Namesake places ==
At least two places in the United States have been named for this town:

- Shrewsbury, Massachusetts
- Shrewsbury, New Jersey

== See also ==
- List of mayors of Shrewsbury
- Listed buildings in Shrewsbury
