= Hardwick House =

Hardwick House may refer to the following buildings:

- Hardwick House, Oxfordshire, England
- Hardwick House, Suffolk, England
- Hardwick House, a Grade II* listed building in Shrewsbury, Shropshire, England
- Hardwick House, a building near Swineshead, Lincolnshire, England
- Hardwick House (Quincy, Massachusetts), United States

== See also ==
- Hardwicke House, a British sitcom
- Hardwick Hall, Derbyshire, England
