= Listed buildings in Shrewsbury =

Shrewsbury is the county town of Shropshire. It contains many listed buildings, which have been divided into three lists.

- Listed buildings in Shrewsbury (northwest central area)
- Listed buildings in Shrewsbury (southeast central area)
- Listed buildings in Shrewsbury (outer areas)
