= Shrewsbury Flower Show =

Coordinates: 52.707°N 2.762°W

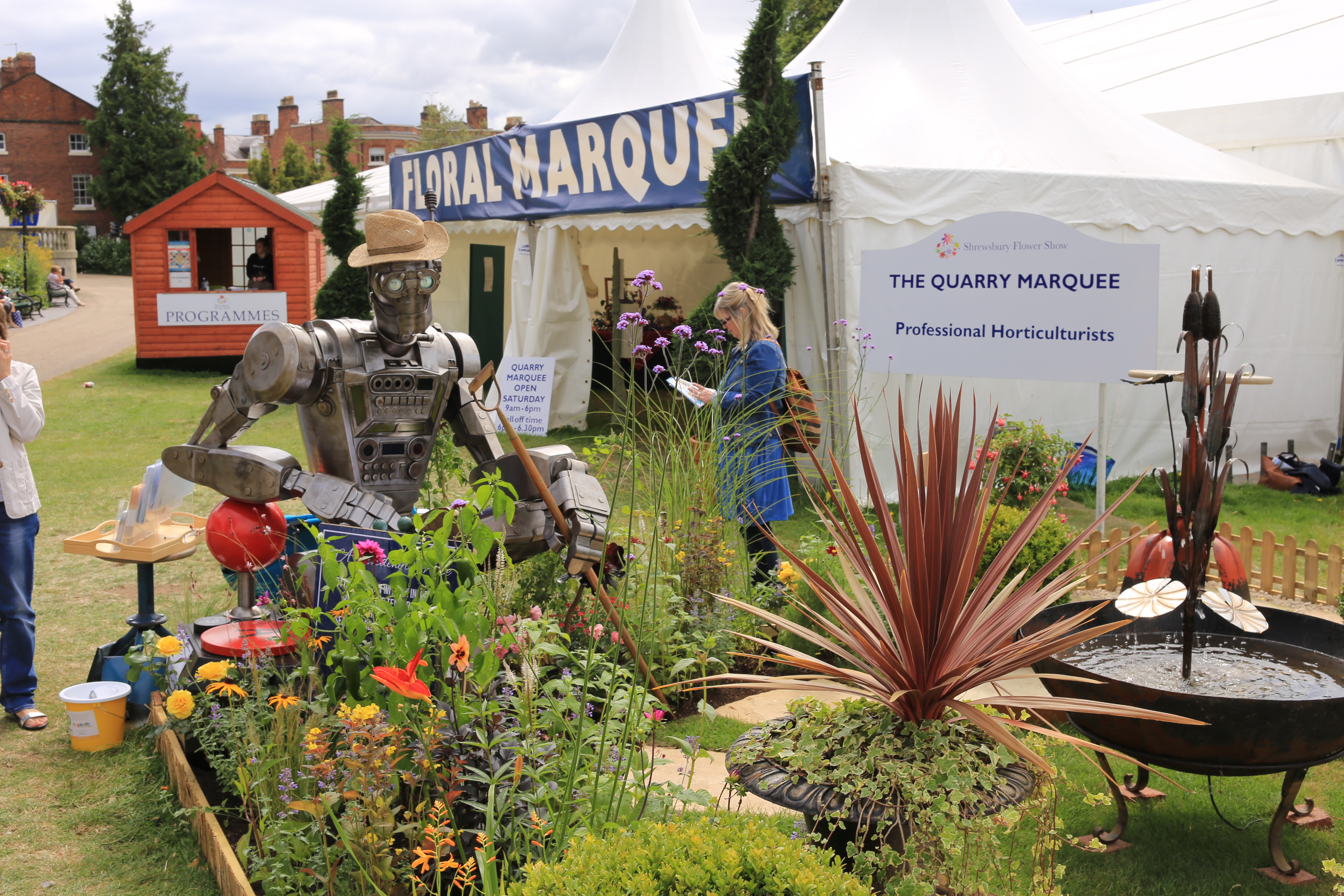
A garden design entry, 2016.

The Shrewsbury Flower Show was an annual event held in mid-August over two days (in recent times the second Friday and Saturday of the month) at The Quarry, the main park in the town of Shrewsbury, the county town of Shropshire, England. The show is organised by the Shropshire Horticultural Society.

It was featured in the 2005 Guinness Book of Records as the "longest-running flower show" in the world.

== Post World War II ==
The show, not held during the Second World War, was revived in 1946, with the organising support of Percy Thrower who was Shrewsbury's Parks Superintendent from that year until 1975, and acted as horticultural advisor and eventually chairman of the Shropshire Horticultural Society. After the show made severe losses due to bad weather in 1970, Thrower and Doug Whittingham both stood as financial guarantors to enable the show, which made a profit in better conditions in 1971, to continue staging.

The long-running show was not held in 2025, with the Shropshire Horticultural Society citing the rising costs of organising the event. Ongoing challenges relating to funding the event also saw the cancellation of the 2026 show.

== Show features ==
The show is set out under a large number of marquees over the 29-acre (120,000 m^{2}) land area of The Quarry and notable features include: the display of flowers, fruit and vegetables; the sale of arts and crafts and three military bands, show jumping, various forms of music and entertainment, which includes a large firework display on both evenings. The show typically attracts around 60,000 visitors over two days.

Chef celebrities, such as James Martin and 'The Hairy Bikers', annually practice demonstrations to the public.
