= Porthill Bridge =

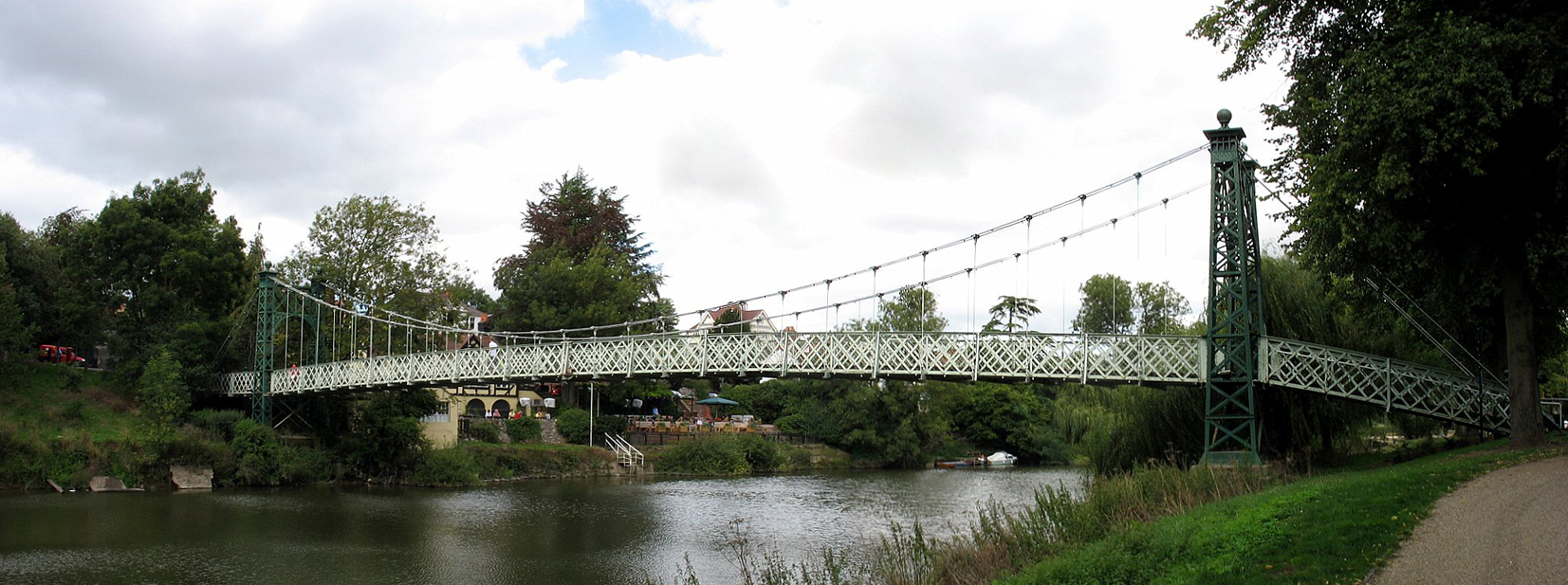
- Porthill Bridge, looking upstream, the Boathouse PH is on the left
- Coordinates: 52.708°N 2.764°W
- Carries: Footpath
- Crosses: River Severn
- Locale: Shrewsbury, Shropshire, England

Characteristics
- Design: Suspension bridge

History
- Constructed by: David Rowell & Co.
- Construction start: 1922
- Opened: 18 January 1923

Statistics
- Toll: No

Porthill Bridge, also often referred to as Port Hill Footbridge, is a suspension bridge for pedestrians crossing the River Severn in Shrewsbury, Shropshire, England.

It connects Porthill with the Quarry and the town centre. Next to it on the Porthill side is the Boathouse public house and Becks Field – both Quarry Park and Becks Field are extensive open green spaces largely preserved from building by their propensity to flood. Porthill Bridge experiences significant vibration, even when few people are crossing it – and has done since it was installed. Local pedestrians mostly accept this eccentricity as part of the bridge's charm.

A ferry operated here until the bridge was built in 1922 by David Rowell & Co. One of the posts to which the cable was attached is still visible on the north bank of the river just a few metres west of the crossing. The bridge was opened on 18 January 1923. £2,000 of the bridge's total £2,600 cost was paid for by the Shropshire Horticultural Society.

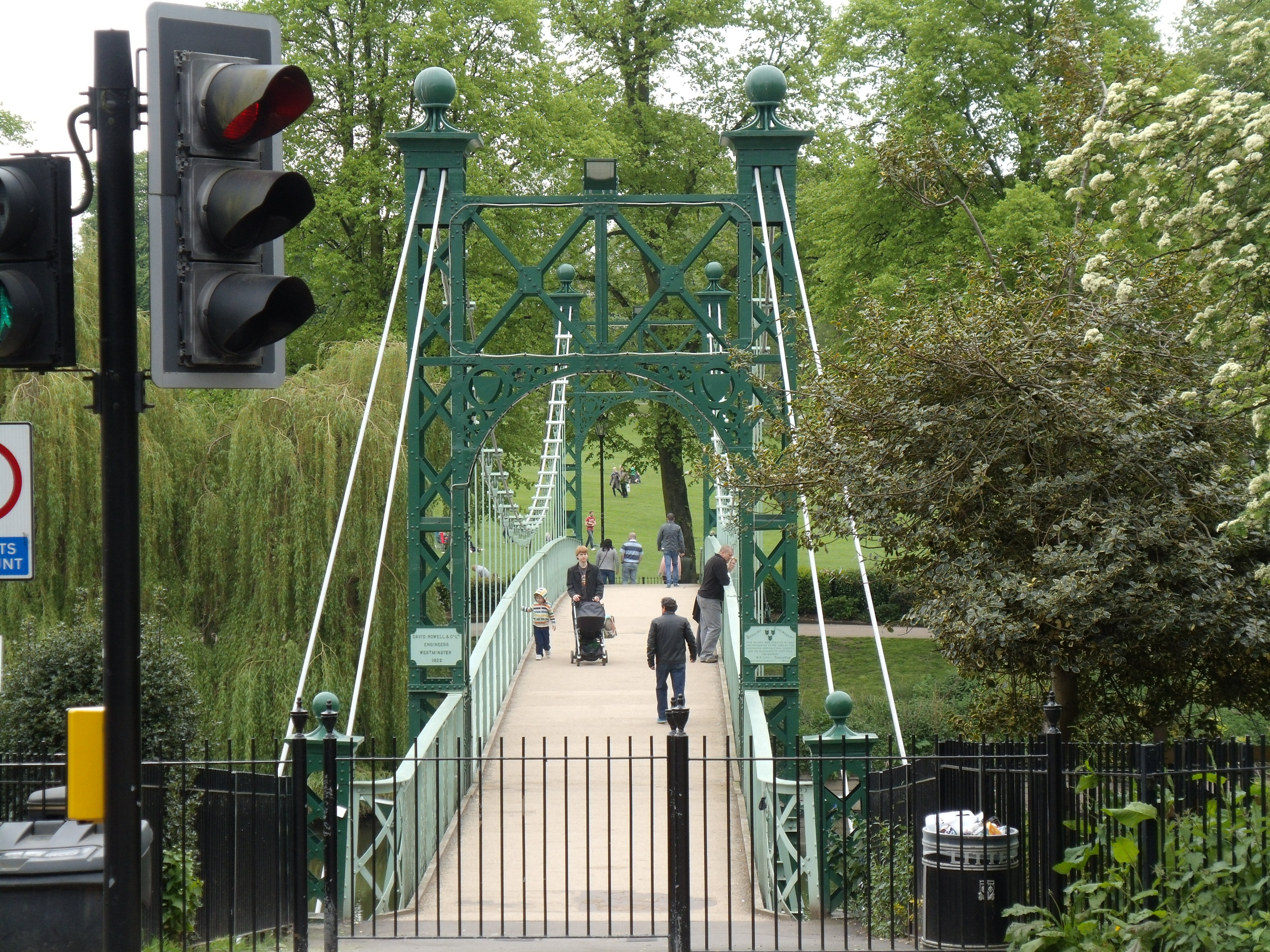
Porthill Bridge after the 2012 refurbishment seen from the Porthill Road side facing towards the Quarry. Previously the black tar cover of the timber deck was uncovered.

From March to July 2012 the bridge was closed for refurbishment, which included repainting the whole bridge and replacing the timber deck, costing £575,000. The bridge was temporarily replaced with a passenger ferry between the Quarry and the Boat House pub with an adult single fare of 50p.

== See also ==
- Crossings of the River Severn

Next crossing upstream	River Severn	Next crossing downstream
Welsh Bridge	Porthill Bridge; Grid reference SJ484125	Kingsland Bridge (Toll road bridge)
Next footbridge upstream	River Severn	Next footbridge downstream
Frankwell Footbridge	Porthill Bridge; Grid reference SJ484125	Greyfriars Footbridge
Next road crossing upstream	River Severn	Next road crossing downstream
Welsh Bridge	Porthill Bridge; Grid reference SJ484125	Kingsland Bridge (Toll road bridge)
