= Kingsland Bridge =

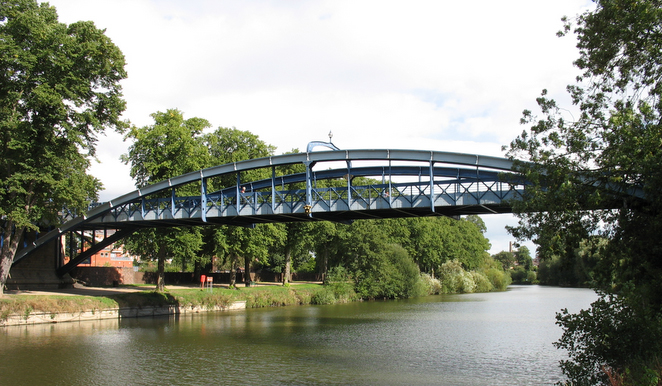
- Kingsland Bridge
- Coordinates: 52°42′16″N 2°45′32″W
- OS grid reference: SJ488121
- Crosses: River Severn
- Locale: Shrewsbury
- Heritage status: Grade II
- Preceded by: Porthill Bridge
- Followed by: Greyfriars Bridge

Characteristics
- Design: arch
- Longest span: 212 ft (65 m)

History
- Designer: John William Grover
- Constructed by: Cleveland Bridge & Engineering Company
- Construction start: 1881
- Construction end: 1882

Statistics
- Toll: 30p (vehicles)

Listed Building – Grade II
- Designated: 30 March 1995
- Reference no.: 1246190

Location
- Interactive map of Kingsland Bridge

Kingsland Bridge is a privately owned toll bridge, spanning the River Severn between Kingsland and Murivance in Shrewsbury, Shropshire, owned and operated by the Shrewsbury (Kingsland) Bridge Company. The toll point is located on the Murivance side and the cost for cars to cross is 30p by contactless credit and debit cards only. The bridge also has an honesty box for pedestrians with a suggested payment of 1p. It is a Grade II listed building.

== History ==
Shrewsbury (Kingsland) Bridge Act 1873
- Act of Parliament
- Parliament of the United Kingdom
- Long title: An Act for making and maintaining a Bridge across the River Severn at Shrewsbury, with Approaches thereto; and for other purposes.
- Citation: 36 & 37 Vict. c. xii

Dates
- Royal assent: 15 May 1873

Shrewsbury (Kingsland) Bridge Act 1880
- Act of Parliament
- Parliament of the United Kingdom
- Long title: An Act for the revival of the powers for making and maintaining a Bridge across the River Severn at Shrewsbury, with Approaches thereto; and for other purposes.
- Citation: 43 & 44 Vict. c. lii

Dates
- Royal assent: 9 July 1880

Text of statute as originally enacted

A bill promoting the toll bridge was passed as the Shrewsbury (Kingsland) Bridge Act 1873 (36 & 37 Vict. c. xii). The bridge was promoted by Henry Robertson, who was also MP for Shrewsbury and designed by the civil engineer John William Grover. It was constructed in 1882 by the Cleveland Bridge & Engineering Company, which also built the Victoria Falls Bridge. The bridge spans 212 feet (64.6m) and comprises two metal arch ribs, from which the main bridge deck is hung. It cost £11,156 to build.

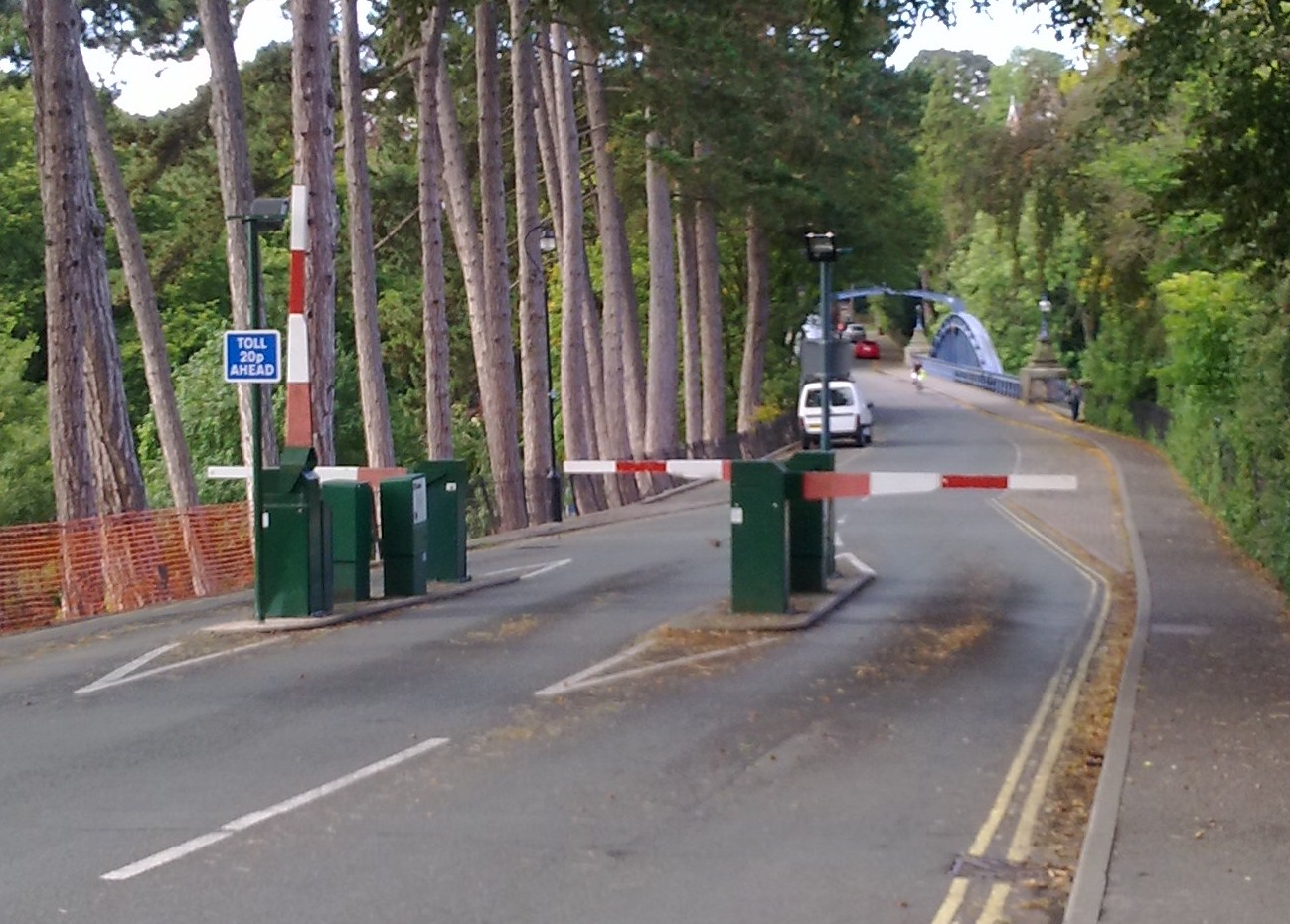
The toll point in August 2011

Shrewsbury (Kingsland) Bridge (Revision of Tolls) Order 2011
- Statutory Instrument
- Parliament of the United Kingdom
- Citation: SI 2011/71

Dates
- Made: 13 January 2011
- Commencement: 1 February 2011

Other legislation
- Repeals/revokes: Shrewsbury (Kingsland) Bridge (Revision of Tolls and Traffic Classification) Order 1995
- Made under: Transport Charges &c. (Miscellaneous Provisions) Act 1954

Text of statute as originally enacted

Shrewsbury (Kingsland) Bridge (Revision of Tolls and Traffic Classification) Order 1995
- Statutory Instrument
- Parliament of the United Kingdom
- Citation: SI 1995/420

Other legislation
- Made under: Transport Charges &c. (Miscellaneous Provisions) Act 1954
- Revoked by: Shrewsbury (Kingsland) Bridge (Revision of Tolls) Order 2011

Status: Revoked

In January 2025, the bridge's owner announced its intention to raise the toll, for the first time in 13 years, from 20p to 30p and only accept payment by contactless. The pay and display parking meters along the approach road, also owned by the company, had already only accepted contactless since June 2024. Previously, the toll point machines and parking meters only accepted payment by coins. The introduction of the new system was delayed by about a month with the new machines operational by March that year.

== See also ==
- Crossings of the River Severn

== Sources ==
- Blackwall, Anthony, Historic Bridges of Shropshire, Shropshire Libraries, 1985, ISBN 0-903802-31-7
- Listed status at Borough council

Upstream: Porthill Bridge	Kingsland Bridge; 1882	Downstream: Greyfriars Bridge
