= The Quarry (park) =

Park in Shrewsbury, England

Coordinates: 52.707°N 2.762°W

The Quarry Park
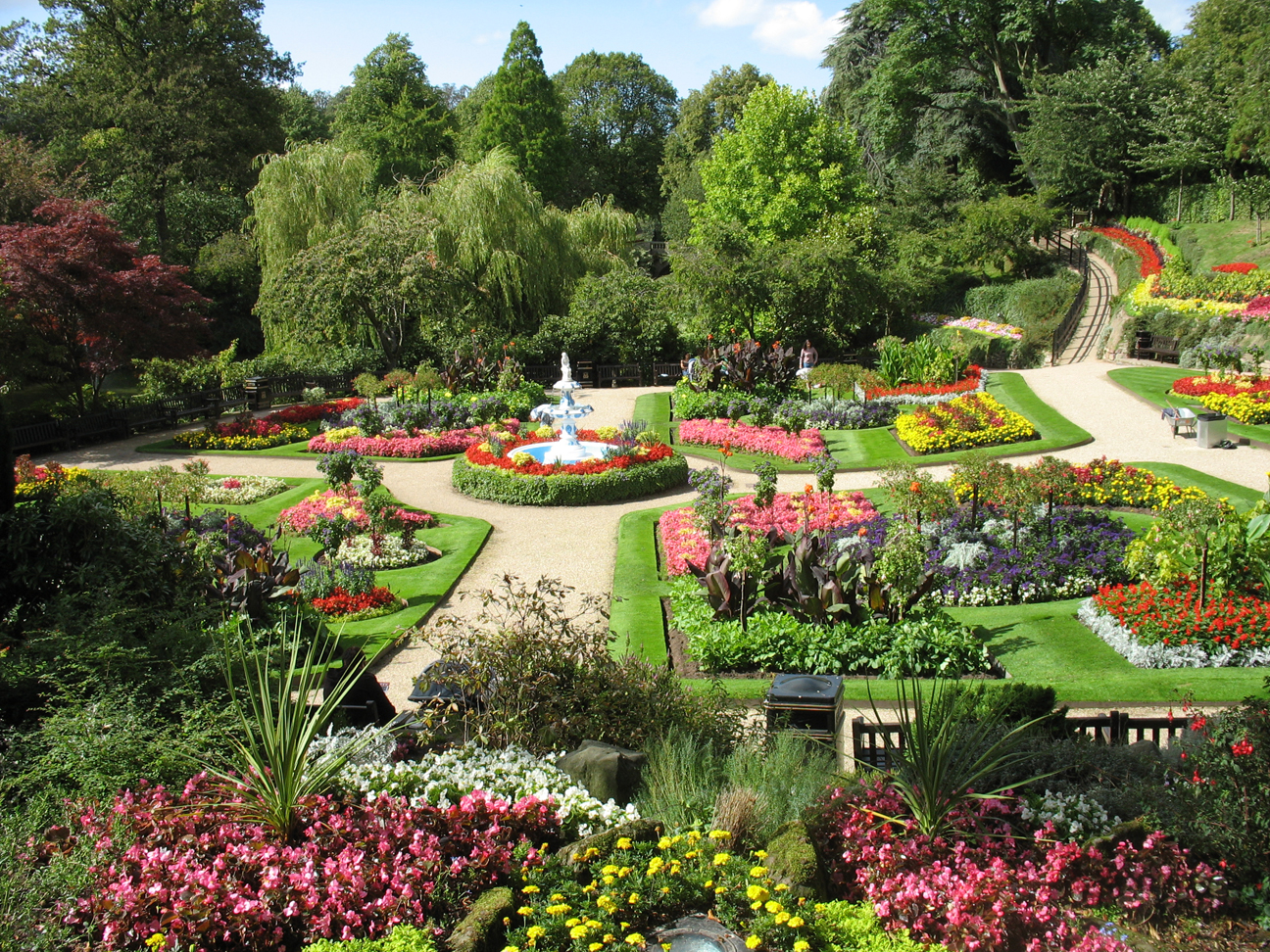
- Shrewsbury Dingle
- Interactive map of The Quarry Park
- Type: Recreational
- Location: Shrewsbury, Shropshire, England
- Area: 29 acres (11.74 ha)
- Created: 1719
- Operator: Shrewsbury Town Council
- Status: Open

The Quarry is the main recreational park in Shrewsbury, the county town of Shropshire, England. The park was created in 1719 and encompasses 29 acres. It is listed Grade II in Historic England's Register of Parks and Gardens. With a location within easy walking distance of Shrewsbury town centre, Shrewsbury Sixth Form College and Shrewsbury School, it is the most heavily used public park within the county.

== Sites of interest ==
=== The Dingle ===
A centrepiece to the park is The Dingle, a former stone quarry, but now a landscaped sunken garden. Between 1324 and 1588 it was known as the Wet or Water Quarry because it was liable to flood. It was quarried for both stone and clay. The project to clear out the Dingle and then plant it was funded by the Shropshire Horticultural Society, with the ornamental gardens opened in 1879, featuring many flower beds and borders, with ponds and fountains. Although there are still formal planted beds, in recent years the planting scheme has become more naturalistic in style, reflecting modern tastes.

==== Shoemakers' Arbour ====
This important structure is associated with the town's unusual history for drama and pageantry and the dedication of Kingsland to that purpose in Tudor and Medieval times. Originally sited in Kingsland, it was moved to the Dingle in 1879. It dates from 1679 and includes statues of Crispin and Crispinian, the patron saints of shoemakers. The gateway is built of stone, and bears the date of 1679 and the initials, H. P. and E. A.; the wardens of the Shoemakers' guild at that time. The Shoemakers' Arbour plays a large part in the song "Thomas Anderson" by David Harley that describes the execution in 1752 of a participant in the Jacobite rising of 1745.

==== Statue of Sabrina ====
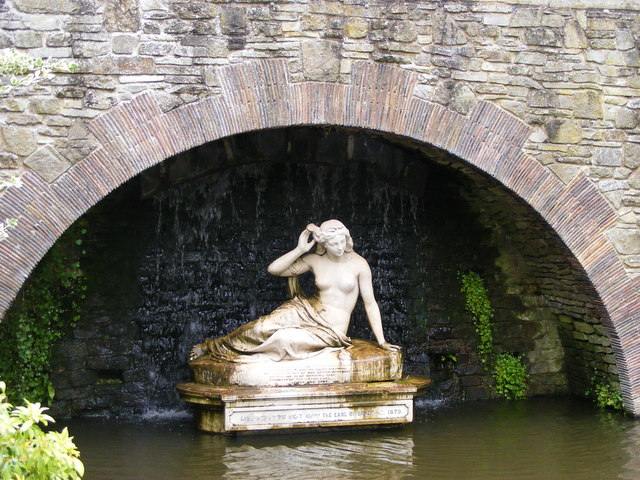
Statue of Sabrina, The Dingle, Shrewsbury

A statue of the goddess Sabrina was presented by the Earl of Bradford in 1879. The inscription on the statue is based on a poem by John Milton (1608–1674). In myth, Sabrina (Welsh: Hafren) was a nymph who drowned in the Severn.

==== War memorial ====
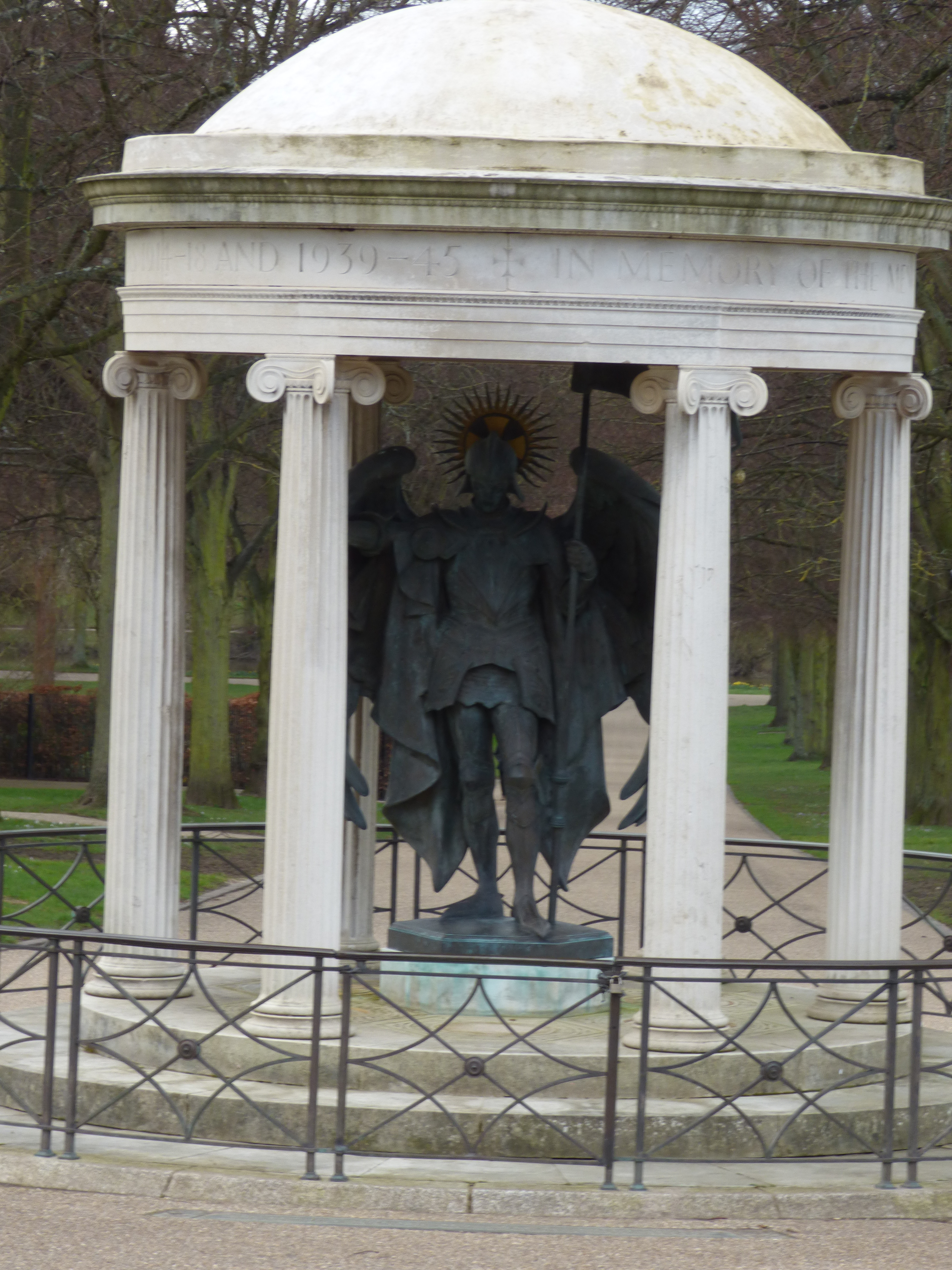
War Memorial in Shrewsbury Quarry

Shropshire county's main war memorial, the focus for Remembrance Sunday, is situated within the Quarry, near St Chad's Terrace. It consists of a bronze winged and armoured statue of St. Michael under a canopy designed like a classical Greek temple in the form of six Ionic columns supporting a circular dome. It is inscribed: 'Remember the gallant men and women of Shropshire who gave their lives for God, King and country 1914-18 and 1939–45'.

This War Memorial was built in 1922–3. It was designed by George Hubbard and Son and built in Portland stone. The richly embellished floor shows the county, King's Shropshire Light Infantry (KSLI) Regimental arms and French Croix de Guerre on a gold mosaic background. The seals or arms of the six boroughs of the county are embossed on the inside frieze. The bronze figure of Saint Michael beneath the canopy is by Allan G Wyon and was cast at the foundry of A.B. Burton of Thames Ditton.

St. Michael the Archangel is viewed as the field commander of the Army of God. In late medieval Christianity, Michael, together with Saint George, became the patron saint of chivalry. Michael is also considered in many Christian circles as the patron saint of the warrior.

===== Bandstand =====
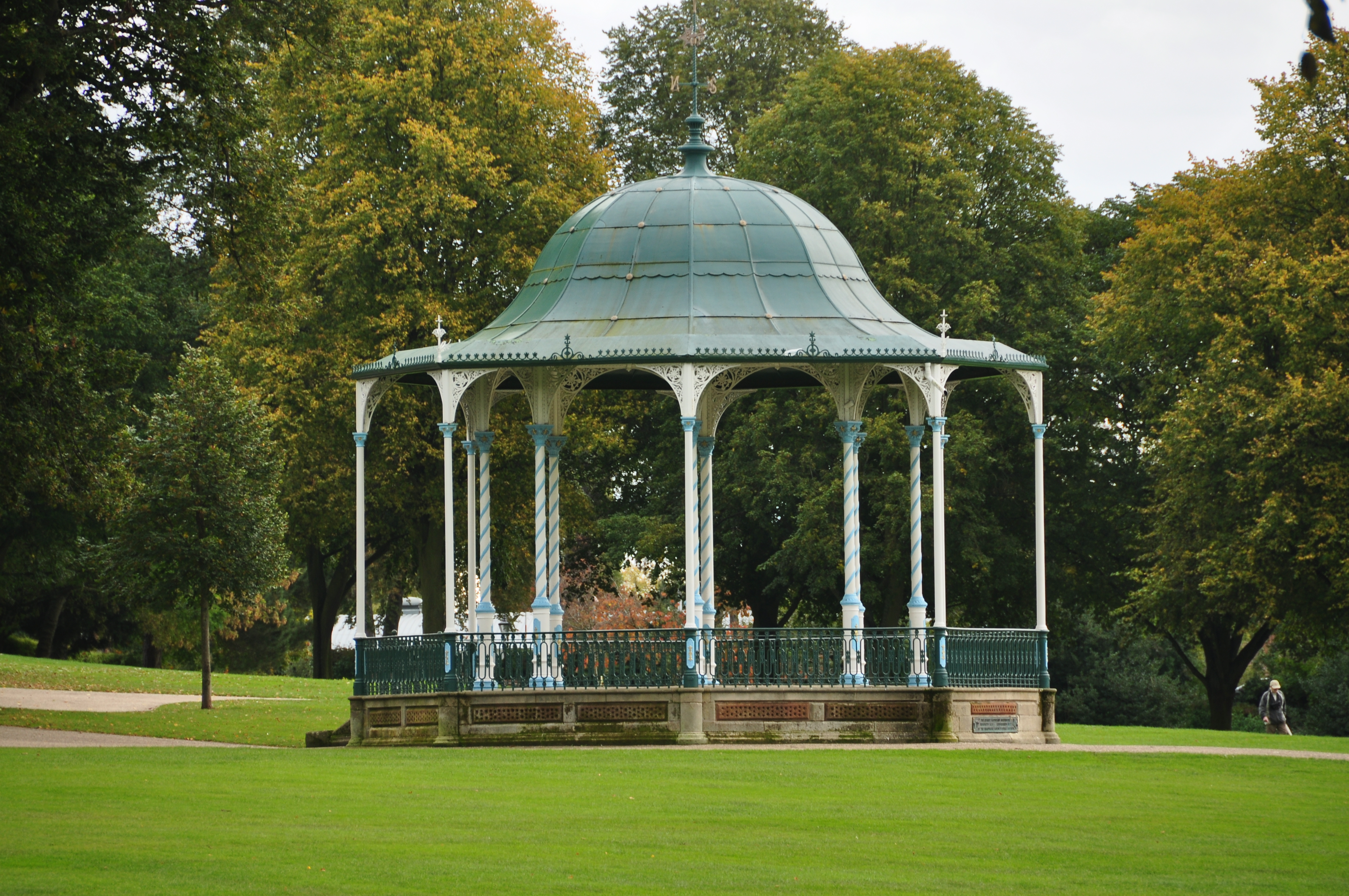
Bandstand Shrewsbury Quarry

This bandstand, which stands below the entrance to the Quarry, was built in 1879 and donated to the park by the Shropshire Horticultural Society. The bandstand is used by military bands during Shrewsbury Flower Show. Other uses include as a dry place for people practising fire arts, and other activities which require shelter from the rain. Between 2006 and 2008 the bandstand had a DJ playing music on most Saturdays during the day.

===== Harley’s Stone =====
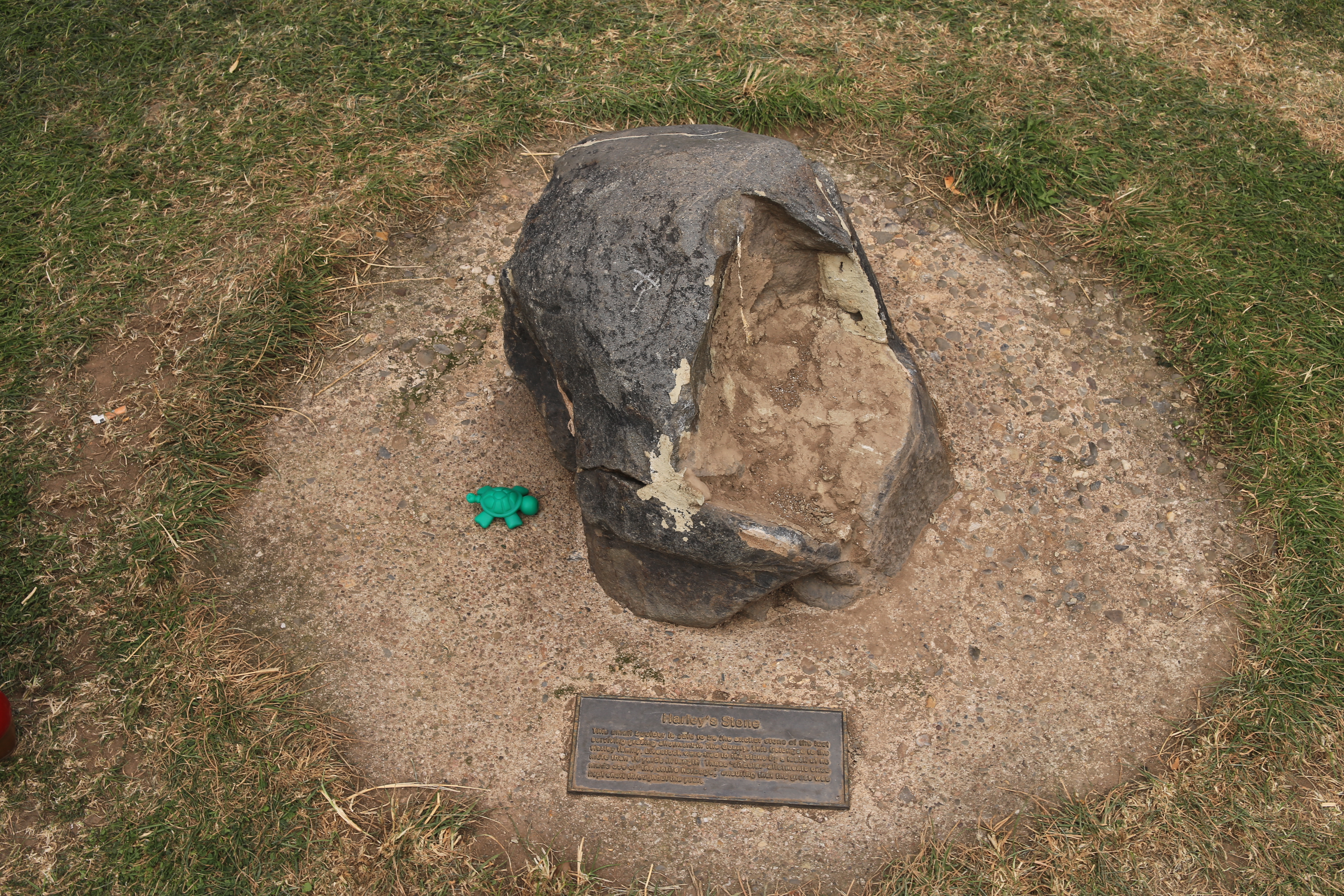
Harley's Stone

This small boulder is said to be the anchor stone of the last surviving grazing allotment in the Quarry, which belonged to the Harley family. Livestock were tied to the stone by a leash of no more than 16 yards in length. These 'circular' allotments once made use of the entire herbage ensuring that the grass was kept short throughout the year. This stone marked the boundary made by the Harley family of Rossall near Bicton, who refused to sell their piece of land to the corporation when the rest of the Quarry was being acquired in the 18th century.

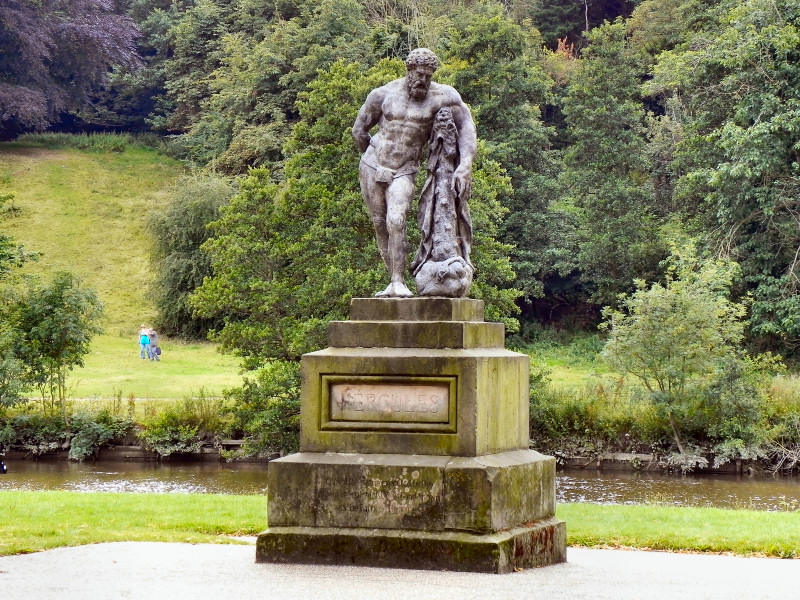
Statue of the Farnese Hercules, Shrewsbury Quarry

==== Hercules Statue ====
There is a statue of Hercules, which stands at the foot of the Quarry Walk, where it connects with Victoria Avenue, besides the River Severn. It originally stood in the courtyard of Condover Hall until it was removed in 1804 and relocated in Shrewsbury, when it was sold to a local plumber for scrap metal, and then stood outside Shrewsbury Prison before being purchased by a mayor and sited at the entrance to the park, opposite St Chad's Church, ultimately moved in 1881 to its present location. The original statue was lead but because of its value the statue in situ is a replica. Wilfred Owen wrote a poem in 1917 describing the statue, while confined in a French Casualty Clearing Station during the First World War.

==== Victoria Avenue ====
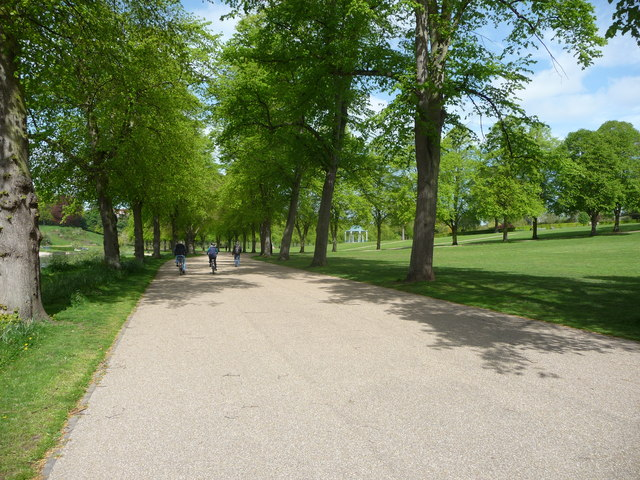
Avenues of Lime Trees in the Park

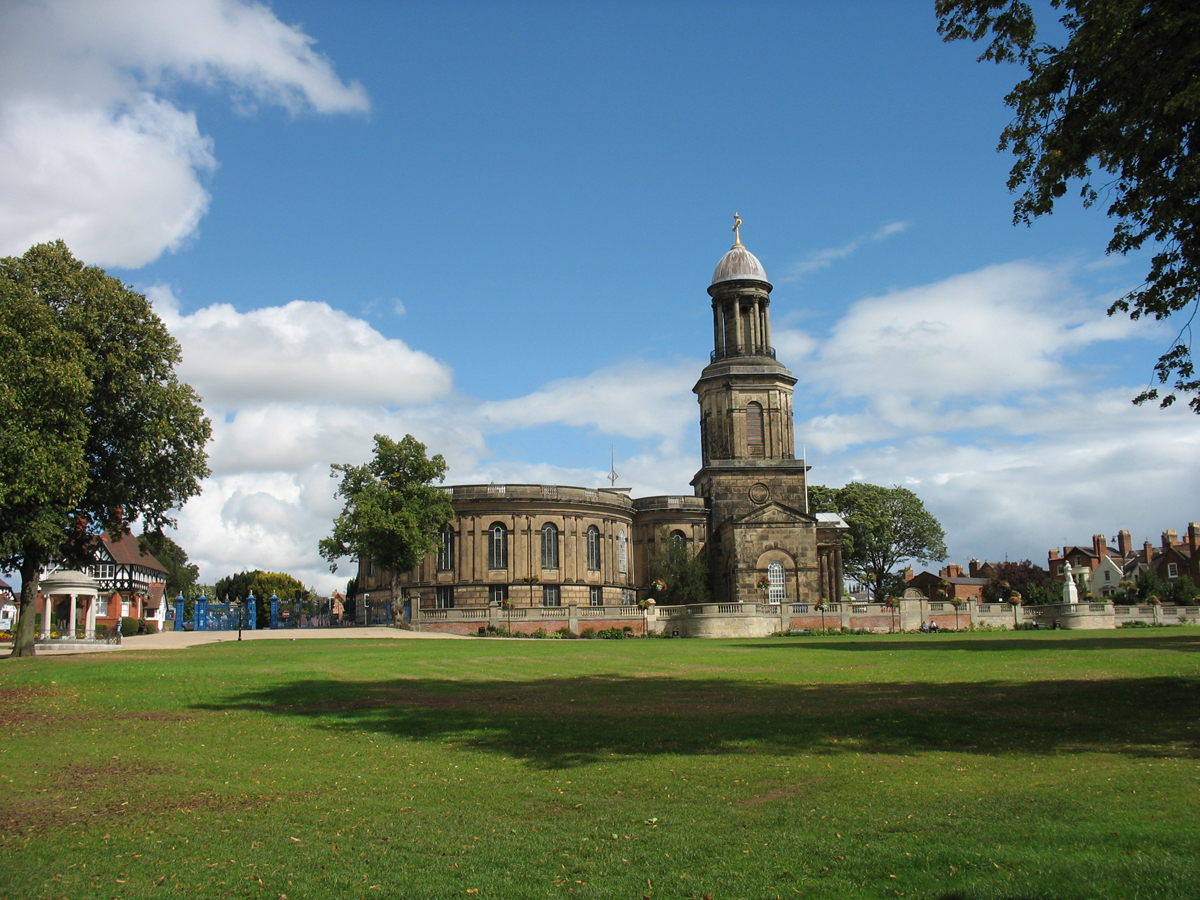
St Chads church sits opposite the Quarry park.

The broad traffic-free avenue that runs along the River Severn is called Victoria Avenue and the largest avenue that runs downhill from the town centre to Victoria Avenue is Gloucester Avenue. The latter was known as Central Avenue, but in 1974 Princess Alice, Duchess of Gloucester came to the Shrewsbury Flower Show and the avenue was dedicated to her. A special feature of Victoria Avenue are the rows of lime trees on each side. These are actually the second generation of trees to be planted. Thomas Wright first planted avenues of hybrid limes in the Quarry in 1719. They had reached heights of over 40 metres by the early 1950s when they were felled on the orders of Percy Thrower. A falling branch had killed a young girl and so the trees were considered unsafe. It was felt that the trees had originally been planted too close together. The felled trees were found to contain bee and wasp nests, large amounts of mistletoe and much dead wood. They were replaced with hybrid limes at much wider spacing which are now reaching maturity. The clone that was planted produces a large number of epicormic sprouts which have to be pruned off annually.

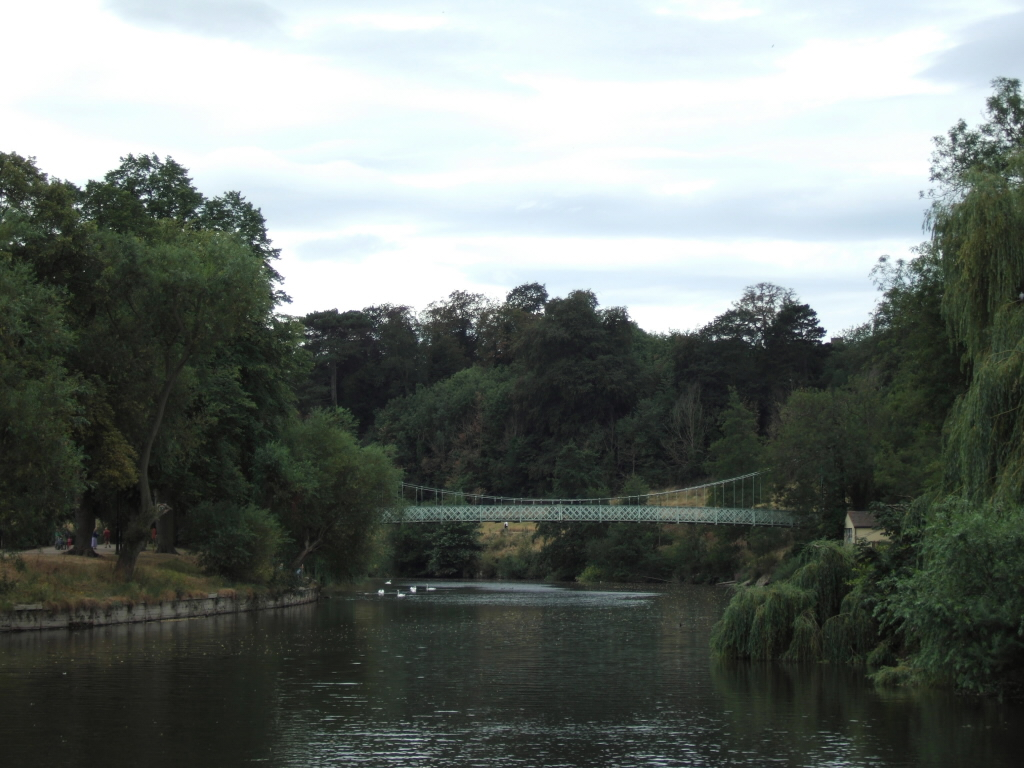
Porthill Bridge crossing the River Severn at The Quarry

Opposite the School Boathouse is the remains of a wooden post used by a ferry crossing the river. In 1900, this was one of two ferry boats operating on the River Severn in the Quarry, the other one being located across the river where Porthill Suspension Bridge has been sited since 1922.

==== Other features and culture ====
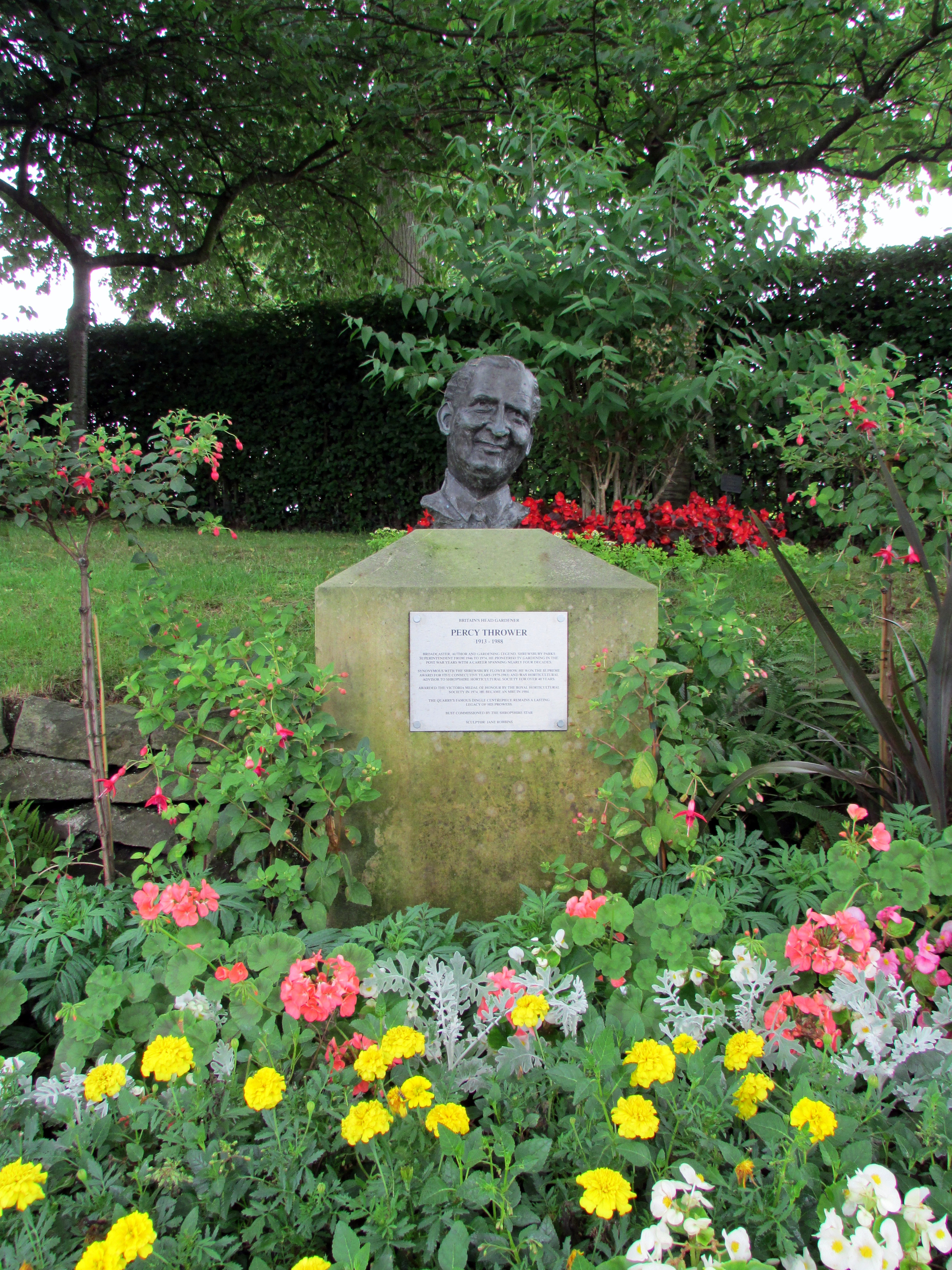
A bust of Percy Thrower in the Dingle gardens of The Quarry, Shrewsbury.

There are numerous memorial benches and plaques within the Dingle.

Of special interest is a bust of the gardening broadcaster Percy Thrower, who for many years was also the Parks Superintendent for Shrewsbury.

According to local legend, the Dingle is haunted by the ghost of Mrs Foxall, a local woman who was burnt at the stake nearby in the sixteenth century as punishment for witchcraft and murder.

== Events ==
=== Shrewsbury Flower Show ===
The Shrewsbury Flower Show is an annual event held in mid-August over two days (in recent times Friday and Saturday) within The Quarry. The show is organised by the Shropshire Horticultural Society and is one of the largest events of its type in the United Kingdom. It is also one of the longest-running shows in the country and featured in the 2005 Guinness Book of Records as the 'longest-running flower show" in the world.'

=== Live music ===
Recently The Quarry has been used as a live music venue, with performances in 2005 from Jools Holland and Will Young. The Sugababes appeared in July 2006. Such events are not without controversy within the town, with complaints that the public park is closed to all but paid ticket-holders during these events, preventing its use for informal recreation. A controversial live-music event by Jessie J in July 2012 was heavily criticised for leaving the Quarry like a mud bath and for excessive litter, with fears that future events may have been put in jeopardy.

=== Other events ===
The river is a focus for the Shrewsbury Regatta and Dragon Boat Races in May and June. As The Quarry is open space close to the town centre, it is often used in civic festivals, such as the annual Darwin Festival. Shrewsbury Carnival and Show is held here every June.

== The Quarry in flood ==
Although the Quarry is sloping, low-lying parts are part of the natural overflow area for the River Severn in times of high flows. As a relatively low intensity land use, the Quarry is allowed to flood preferentially to other more built-up areas of the town.

The boat launching jetty by Porthill Bridge is under water many times during a typical winter, with Victoria Avenue and the children's playground flooded perhaps once a year. Every few years, river flows are such that flood water almost reaches the Bandstand. A causeway of higher ground has been constructed to allow people to walk from Porthill Bridge towards St Chad's Church during most flood events.

== See also ==
- Listed buildings in Shrewsbury (northwest central area)
