= John William Grover =

John William Grover (20 April 1836 – 23 August 1892), was an early English consulting civil engineer responsible for several notable buildings in London and railway lines in England, Wales, Mexico and Venezuela. He was the inventor of the split washer.

== Early life ==
Grover was the only son of Henry Montague Grover, the rector of Hitcham, Buckinghamshire. He was sent to Marlborough College and studied in Germany and under the engineer Sir Charles Fox. He left to work for the railway engineer John Fowler, surveying routes in Portugal. He then joined the Science and Art Department, supervising and designing parts of the South Kensington Museum, the conservatory of the Royal Horticultural Society and domes for the 1862 International Exhibition.

== Consulting career ==
He set up his own consulting business in London in 1862, working on railways and structures. His projects included:

- several English railways, including branches for Manchester and Milford, Hemel Hempstead, Westerham Valley Branch Line
- Welsh railways in Merionethshire and Carmarthenshire
- Mexican and continental railway surveys
- Venezuelan railways, notably surveying the mountain route from La Guaira to Caracas in 1872
- La Guaira, Venezuela hydrographic survey for proposed harbour works and Los Roques lighthouse
- Clevedon Pier, Somersetshire
- the Kingsland Bridge over the River Severn
- the roof of the Royal Albert Hall, assisting Major-General Henry Y. D. Scott, RE

Later in his career he designed waterworks and water supplies, specialising in chalk aquifers, designing supplies to service London, Westerham, Newbury, Wokingham, Leatherhead, Rickmansworth and Uxbridge. He also designed water schemes at Bridgend, West Indies, Egypt, Austria, Denmark, Italy, and Switzerland.

In addition to being a member of the Institution of Civil Engineers, his interest in Ancient Roman artifacts led him to membership of the Society of Antiquaries and the British Archaeological Association.

He died at his home at Clapham after a long illness, on 23 August 1892, aged 56, and was buried at West Norwood Cemetery.

== Sources ==
- Obituary, The Times 31 Aug 1892
- T. H. Beare, rev. Mike Chrimes. "Grover, John William". Oxford Dictionary of National Biography.
