= Henry Montague Grover =

Henry Montague Grover (1791–1866) was an English lawyer, cleric and writer.

== Life ==
Born at Watford, Hertfordshire, he was the eldest son of Harry Grover, solicitor, of Hemel Hempstead, by Sybilla, daughter of George Phillip Ehret. He was educated at St. Albans grammar school. By 1816 he had established himself in practice as a solicitor in London.

Grover retired from business in 1824, and went to Peterhouse, Cambridge, where he graduated LL.B. in 1830. Having taken holy orders he was presented in 1833 to the rectory of Hitcham, Buckinghamshire. Because of disabling illness, he lived in seclusion. He died at Hitcham on 20 August 1866. John William Grover was his son.

== Works ==
Grover's works were:

- Anne Boleyn, a tragedy (in five acts and in verse), London, 1826.
- Socrates, a dramatic poem (in five acts, with notes), London, 1828.
- The History of the Resurrection authenticated. A Review of the Four Gospels on the Resurrection, London, 1841.
- Analogy and Prophecy, Keys of the Church. Shewing the progress of the Dispensation and the Interpretation of the Prophecies by analogies derived from the Mosaic Creation, London, 1846.
- A Voice from Stonehenge, pt. i., London, 1847.
- Changes of the Poles and the Equator, considered as a source of error in the present construction of the maps and charts of the globe, London, 1848.
- A Catechism for Sophs (a "summary of scriptural doctrine"), London, 1848.
- Soundings of Antiquity: a new method of applying the astronomical evidences to the events of history, and an assignment of true dates to the epochs of the Church, London, 1862.

Grover wrote also a political pamphlet Corn and Cattle against Cotton and Calico, articles in the Journal of Sacred Literature, and papers on the "Theory of the Sun's Orbit" and on "Tides".

== Notes ==
Attribution

This article incorporates text from a publication now in the public domain: Stephen, Leslie; Lee, Sidney, eds. (1890). "Grover, Henry Montague". Dictionary of National Biography. Vol. 23. London: Smith, Elder & Co.
