= Hardwick House (Quincy, Massachusetts) =

Historic house in Massachusetts, United States

- U.S. National Register of Historic Places
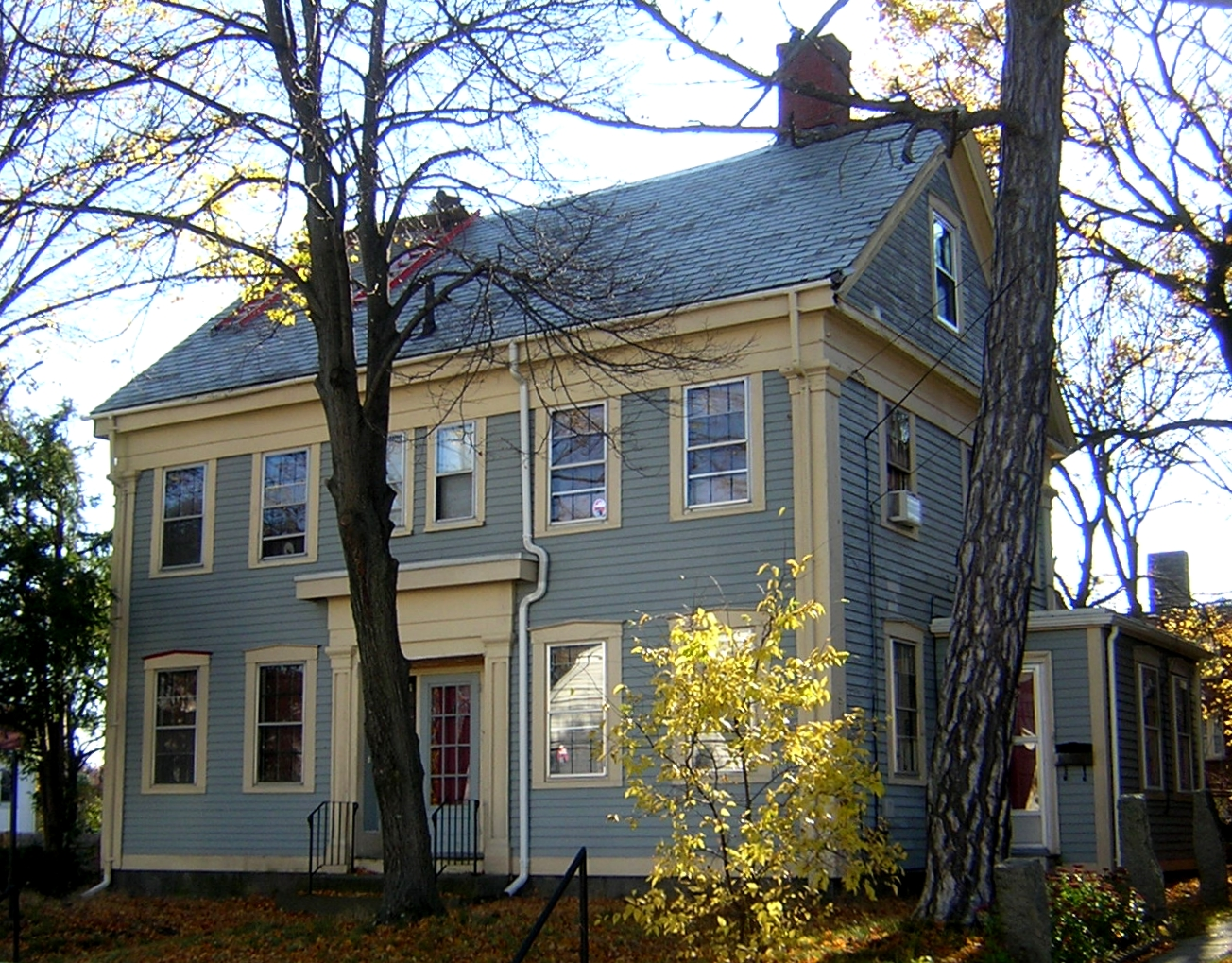

- Location within Massachusetts Location within the United States
- Location: 59–61 Spear St., Quincy, Massachusetts
- Coordinates: 42°15′4.7″N 70°59′56.4″W
- Area: 0.2 acres (0.081 ha)
- Built: 1850
- Architectural style: Greek Revival
- MPS: Quincy MRA
- NRHP reference No.: 89001376
- Added to NRHP: September 20, 1989

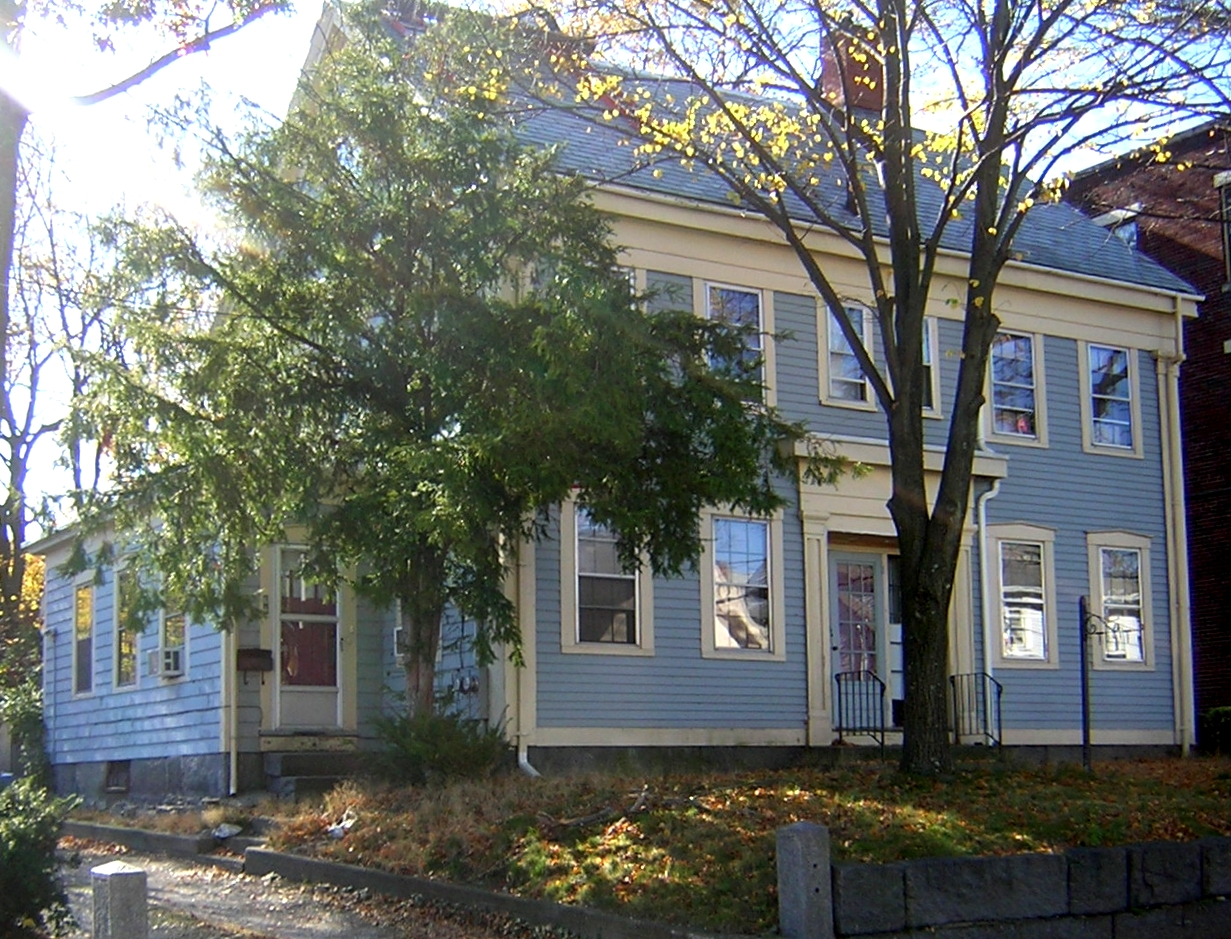

The Hardwick House was a historic house at 59–61 Spear Street in Quincy, Massachusetts. The 2 1/2-story wood-frame house was built in 1850s, and is one of the city's largest Greek Revival houses. Its massing, with side-gable roof, is more typical of the Federal period, but it has corner pilasters, a full entablature, and pedimented gables. The main entry has full-length side lights and is topped by an entablature. The house was built by Franklin Hardwick, owner of a local granite business.

The house was listed on the National Register of Historic Places in 1989.It was torn down by developers for profit despite its history. The city has claimed there was nothing that could be done as it was outside of the historical district.

== See also ==
- National Register of Historic Places listings in Quincy, Massachusetts
