= Listed buildings in Shrewsbury (northwest central area) =

Shrewsbury is a civil parish in Shropshire, England. It contains nearly 800 listed buildings that are recorded in the National Heritage List for England. Of these, 14 are listed at Grade I, the highest of the three grades, 71 are at Grade II*, the middle grade, and the others are at Grade II, the lowest grade.

Shrewsbury is the county town of Shropshire, it is a market town and the commercial centre for the county and for mid-Wales. It stands on the River Severn, and its centre is almost surrounded by a large curve in the river. The oldest substantial surviving buildings in the town are Shrewsbury Castle and Shrewsbury Abbey, together with a number of churches and the town walls. The town flourished commercially during the 13th century, mainly from the wool trade, and a number of friaries were founded. Two major bridges were built, the Welsh Bridge at the north of the town, linking its centre with the suburb of Frankwell, and the English Bridge to the east, linking with the abbey and the suburb of Abbey Foregate. Following a decline in fortune during the 15th century, trade revived during the later 16th century, mainly from Welsh cloth, and impressive houses were built, most of which were timber framed. There was particular growth during the 18th century, when more impressive properties and public buildings were constructed, now in brick. A public park was created on the site of a former quarry, and named appropriately The Quarry. There was little heavy industry in the town, but at the end of the 18th century Ditherington Flax Mill was built, the first fully iron-framed building in the world. At the same time, the Shrewsbury Canal was opened, and the railway arrived in the town in 1848. There was further development during the 19th century in the town centre and the suburbs. Shrewsbury School, originally a grammar school in the town centre, moved to a new site south of the river in 1882, and has become an independent school. During the 20th century there has been continuing development in and around the town.

Due to the large number of listed buildings, they have been divided into three lists, based on geographical areas. The central area of the town is almost surrounded by the river, and this has been split into two lists, divided by the roads running from the southwest to the northeast, named respectively St John's Hill, Shoplatch, Pride Hill, Castle Street, Castle Gates, and Castle Foregate. The other list contains the listed buildings in the areas outside the central area. This list contains the listed buildings on the named roads and in the area to the northwest of these. Most of these are houses and associated structures, public houses and hotels, shops and offices. The two Grade I listed buildings are the Library, originally Shrewsbury Grammar School, and St Chad's Church. The church overlooks The Quarry, in and around which are a number of listed structures.

== Key ==
Grade	Criteria
I	Buildings of exceptional interest, sometimes considered to be internationally important
II*	Particularly important buildings of more than special interest
II	Buildings of national importance and special interest

== Buildings ==
Name and location	Photograph	Date	Notes	Grade
Remains of Bennett's Hall; 52.70845°N 2.75447°W	—	13th century	The remains of a medieval merchant's two-storey house have been enclosed in a modern structure. They are in sandstone and consist of fragments of walls containing arches and a fireplace.	II
10 and 11 Pride Hill; 52.70857°N 2.75361°W	—	c. 1400	A pair of shops, mostly dating from the early 18th century. The earliest parts of the building are the sandstone rear wall and the extensive cellars of No. 11. The rest of the building is in painted brick, with a sill band and a tile roof. There are three storeys and five bays. In the ground floor are shop fronts, the upper floors contain sash windows, and there are four roof dormers.	II
Riggs Hall; 52.71062°N 2.75115°W		Early 15th century	The hall, which has been extensively restored, was part of the original Shrewsbury School and has since been incorporated in the library. It is timber framed on a high sandstone plinth and has a tile roof. There are two storeys, and the building consists of a hall range and a cross-wing. In the upper floors are four-light casement windows.	II
The King's Head Public House; 52.70946°N 2.75648°W		Early 15th century	The public house is timber framed with a tile roof, three storeys and two bays. In the ground floor is a central doorway and continuous bands of windows. Both upper storeys are jettied. In the middle floor are casement windows with traceried heads, and the top floor contains six-light casement windows. Inside is a wall painting dating from about 1500.	II*
51 and 52 Mardol; 52.70935°N 2.75624°W	—	15th century	A house, later a shop, with a 16th-century timber framed front, and a tile roof. There are three storeys and two bays. In the ground floor is a 20th-century shop front with an earlier fascia on moulded console brackets. In the middle floor are sash windows, and the top floor is jettied with a moulded bressumer, and contains horizontally-sliding sash windows.	II
63 Mardol; 52.70879°N 2.75567°W		Early 16th century	A house, later a shop, on a corner site, it is timber framed with a Welsh slate roof. There are three storeys, each storey jettied. In the ground floor is a shop front, the front facing Mardol has an oriel window in the middle floor, a moulded bressumer above, and in the top floor are two mullioned and transomed windows. The front facing Roushill has brick in the ground floor, three oriel windows, and two parallel gables.	II
40 Pride Hill; 52.70843°N 2.75357°W	—	Early 16th century	A timber framed shop with a tile roof, three storeys and one bay. In the ground floor is a 20th-century shop front, and above is a projecting full-height bay window with small flanking balconies. In the middle floor is a five-light mullioned and transomed window, the top floor contains a four-light casement window, and at the top is a gable with decorative bargeboards and a finial.	II
27 Mardol; 52.70938°N 2.75661°W	—	Early to mid-16th century (probable)	A timber framed shop with a tile roof, two storeys and an attic, and one wide gabled bay. In the ground floor is a 19th-century shop front with a central doorway flanked by oriel windows. The upper storey is jettied; this and the attic contain casement windows.	II
22 and 23 Claremont Hill; 52.70780°N 2.75790°W	—	16th century	A pair of houses that were refronted in the 18th century. They are timber framed with a brick front, and have a tile roof. There are two storeys and attics, a front of two bays, and later rear wings. On the front are a pair of doorways to the right, sash windows with segmental heads, and gabled roof dormers. The right side is gabled and has exposed timber framing on a stone plinth. The upper storey is jettied with a moulded bressumer.	II
11 Mardol; 52.70861°N 2.75574°W	—	16th century	A house, later a shop, dating mainly from 1700. It has a timber framed core, encased in stuccoed brick, with angle quoins, a coved eaves cornice, and a tile roof. There are three storeys and an attic, two bays, and a rear wing. In the ground floor is a 20th-century shop front, the windows are sashes and there is a hip roofed dormer. On the front is a circular dated plaque, and there is substantial timber framing in the rear wing.	II
Buildings to rear of 53 Mardol; 52.70944°N 2.75606°W	—	16th century	Most of the buildings date from the 19th century, and originated as warehouses and workshops. The earlier range parallel to the street is timber framed, the later range is in brick, and they have tile roofs. The later range has 2½ storeys and three bays, and contains windows, doorways, and loading doors, one with a hoist in a gabled dormer.	II
The Old School House; 52.71038°N 2.75126°W		16th century	The house was refronted in about 1818 in Neo-Tudor style. It is in painted brick with a tile roof and two storeys with attics. To the right is a projecting gable and bay. In the angle is a doorway with a hood mould, and to the left is a full-height canted bay window with an embattled parapet. In the upper floor are mullioned windows with hood moulds.	II
Building adjacent to The Old School House; 52.71027°N 2.75133°W	—	16th century (probable)	The building has a timber framed core, and was refronted in 1818 in Neo-Tudor style. It is in painted brick with a tile roof. There are two storeys with attics, and three bays with a projecting gable on the left. The doorway is in a porch with an embattled parapet, and has a four-centred arched head. The windows are mullioned with hood moulds, and there are antique sculptural fragments built into the walls of the porch.	II
15 and 16 Hill's Lane; 52.70934°N 2.75756°W	—	Late 16th century	A pair of shops in brick over timber framing with brick infill, and with a tile roof. There are two storeys and an attic, and three bays. In the left bay, which is gabled, is a two-storey canted bay window. The ground floor contains two shop fronts and a central doorway. The windows in the upper floor of the middle and right bays are sashes, and in the right bay is a gabled dormer. At the rear is exposed timber framing.	II
26 Mardol; 52.70934°N 2.75655°W		Late 16th century	A pair of timber framed shops with a tile roof. They have two storeys and attics, and each shop has one bay. In the ground floor are 20th-century shop fronts, the upper floor contains tripartite sash windows, and in the attic are wide gabled dormers with sash windows.	II
78 Mardol; 52.70806°N 2.75493°W	—	Late 16th century	A shop on a corner site that was extended in the 19th century. The earlier part facing Mardol is timber framed with a tile roof. It has two storeys and an attic, and four bays. In the ground floor is a 20th-century shop front, the upper floor contains casement windows, and there is a gabled attic dormer. The extension, originally a separate building, now incorporated, faces Mardol Head. It is in painted brick, and has four storeys and three bays, and to the left is a Dutch gabled false front. The extension has a shop front in the ground floor and sash windows above.	II
Rowley's House and Rowley's Mansion; 52.70853°N 2.75715°W		Late 16th century	A pair of houses, later converted into a museum. The older is Rowley's House, which is timber framed, and has three storeys and an attic. It has seven bays, and consists of a main range divided by an archway, and a cross-wing. There is a deep jetty on the street side, gables on the front and rear, and casement windows, some with mullions, and some with transoms. Rowley's Mansion dates from 1618, and is attached to the house. It is in brick with string courses and quoins, and has three storeys and attics. Features include gables, a full-height square bay window, a porch with a moulded surround and an entablature with a triglyph frieze, and a doorway with a segmental arch, stepped voussoirs, and a bulbous keystone. The windows are mullioned and transomed.	II*
Library; 52.71051°N 2.75091°W		1595	The library originated as Shrewsbury Grammar School, and was built in two phases, the second phase dated 1630. It is faced in Grinshill sandstone, and has an L-shaped plan with three storeys, two ranges at right angles, and a clock tower between. The north range is the earlier, and is gabled. The east range is larger, with five bays, and in the centre is a segmental-headed archway with fluted Corinthian columns, each surmounted by a statue of a male figure. The windows are mullioned or mullioned and transomed, there are string courses, sundials etched on to the faces on two sides, and the parapet has fleur-de-lis finials. The tower has six stages, a clock face, and an embattled parapet with pinnacles.	I
15 and 16 Mardol and 1 Hill's Lane; 52.70877°N 2.75589°W		c. 1600	A shop on a corner site that was extensively restored in the 20th century, it is timber framed with a tile roof. There are three storeys and an attic, two bays on Mardol, and two wide gabled bays on Hill's Lane. In the ground floor are shop fronts, the front on Mardol has a central doorway flanked by canted bay windows. In the upper floors are two full-height oriel windows containing mullioned and transomed windows, with balustrading between the storeys, and gables with cusped bargeboards and finials. The front on Hill's Lane contains doorways and windows, some of which are casements, and others are horizontally-sliding sashes.	II*
School Chambers; 52.71012°N 2.75129°W	—	c. 1600	A house, later shops, with extensions in about 1900. The original part is timber framed, the extensions are in brick with applied timber framing, and the roof is tiled. The building consists of three parallel ranges with gables facing the street, the middle range the oldest, and a rear range at right angles. In the ground floor are inserted shop fronts, and in the middle range are casement windows.	II
29 Castle Street; 52.70965°N 2.75114°W		Early 17th century	A timber framed shop with a tile roof, two storeys and an attic, and one bay. In the ground floor is a shop front, and above, asymmetrically placed, is a canted bay window containing a tripartite sash window in the upper floor, and a casement window in the attic. Below the windows is balustraded decoration. The attic is gabled with bargeboards and a pendant finial, and the gable apex is slightly jettied on moulded brackets.	II
16 St John's Hill; 52.70653°N 2.75797°W	—	Early 17th century	Part of a formerly larger house, it is in painted brick with a tile roof. There are two storeys and three bays. In the ground floor is a doorway with an architrave and a canopy on consoles. The windows are sashes, and there are three tall dormers that have gables with bargeboards.	II
17 St John's Hill; 52.70647°N 2.75805°W	—	Early 17th century	Part of a larger previous house, it is in stuccoed brick with possibly a timber framed core, and has a tile roof. There are two storeys and four bays, consisting of a two-bay hall range and a two-bay gabled cross-wing to the right. The gable has parapeted eaves, bargeboards and a finial. The doorway is at the angle, and has a lugged architrave and a cornice, and the windows are sashes.	II
10 Claremont Hill; 52.70768°N 2.75790°W	—	17th century	The house was refaced in the 18th century and probably has a timber framed core. There is a tiled gambrel roof, two storeys and an attic, and two bays. The doorway has a hood on console brackets, and the windows are sashes.	II
12 Claremont Hill; 52.70767°N 2.75802°W	—	17th century	The house, which has a timber framed core, was refaced in the 18th century. It is in roughcast brick, and has a tile roof, two storeys and one bay. The doorway is to the right, and there is a casement window in each floor.	II
15A Claremont Hill; 52.70772°N 2.75841°W	—	17th century (possible)	The house is timber framed, it was refaced in the 18th century, and has a stone plinth and a tile roof. There are two storeys and two bays. Steps lead up to a doorway on the left, there is a passageway on the right, the windows in the ground floor are bowed, and in the upper floor they are casements.	II
18 and 19 Claremont Hill; 52.70776°N 2.75812°W	—	17th century	A timber framed group of three houses that were refronted in brick in the 18th century, it has a dentilled eaves cornice, and a tiled mansard roof was added later. The front range has two storeys, and attic and a basement, and three bays, and there is a rear wing forming two further dwellings. To the left is a doorway with an architrave and a hood on consoles brackets. The windows are a mix of sashes and casements, and there are two dormers. There is exposed timber framing with brick infill in the basement.	II
20 and 21 Claremont Hill; 52.70777°N 2.75799°W	—	17th century (possible)	A pair of houses with an 18th-century front, possibly over a timber framed core. The front is in brick, there is a dentilled eaves cornice, and the roof is tiled. There are two storeys and attics and four bays. On the left is a passageway containing a doorway, on the front is a doorway with a pediment, the windows are sashes, and there are gabled attic dormers.	II
17A Hill's Lane; 52.70926°N 2.75739°W	—	17th century	A shop, formerly part of a maltings, it was refaced in the 18th century. The building is mainly in brick, with some stone, and has two storeys and an attic, and one bay. In the ground floor is a shop front, above are inserted windows, and at the top is a crow-stepped gable.	II
45 Mardol; 52.70964°N 2.75666°W		17th century	A shop with a timber framed core that was refronted in the 19th century. It is in rendered brick with angle quoins, parapet eaves, and a tile roof. There are three storeys, two bays on Mardol, and two wide bays on Smithfield, including an attic. The Mardol front has an early 20th-century shop front with a central recessed doorway and a continuous fascia on console brackets, and a hood. The upper floors contain tripartite sash windows.	II
31, 32 and 33 Pride Hill; 52.70860°N 2.75308°W		17th century	A row of three shops that were refronted in about 1900. They have a timber framed core, and on the front is applied timber framing. They have tile roofs, two storeys and tall gabled attics, and each shop has one bay. In the ground floor are shop fronts, and the gables have fretted bargeboards and finials. In the upper parts of No. 31 is a full-height oriel window containing mullioned and transomed windows and balustraded timbering. The other shops contain sash windows with hood moulds.	II
9 Claremont Hill; 52.70769°N 2.75787°W	—	Late 17th century	A timber framed house that was refronted in brick in the 18th century, it has a tile roof. There are two storeys and an attic, and two bays. The doorway has a pediment, the windows are sashes, and there is a gabled dormer.	II
Scott's Mansion; 52.70782°N 2.75767°W	—	Late 17th century	A house, later three shops, in painted brick with a moulded sill band, ovesailing eaves, and a hipped tile roof. There are two storeys and attics, and five bays divided by pilasters. In the ground floor are three shop fronts and a doorway to the upper floor. The upper floor contains sash windows, and there are three attic dormers.	II
Shoemakers' Arbour; 52.70690°N 2.76110°W	—	1679	The structure is in The Dingle in The Quarry, and was moved from another site in 1877. It is in sandstone, and has fluted Corinthian pilasters carrying an entablature carved with a coat of arms and the figures of Saints Crispin and Crispinian, the patron saints of shoemakers. Below is a semicircular archway leading to a stone grotto containing an inscribed plaque.	II
60 Mardol; 52.70893°N 2.75579°W		c. 1700	A house, later a shop, in painted brick, possibly on a timber framed core. It has angle quoins, a moulded modillion eaves cornice and a tile roof with coped gables. There are three storeys and attics, and three bays. In the ground floor is a shop front, the upper floors contain sash windows with segmental heads and keystones, those in the middle bay blind, and there are two pedimented dormers.	II
1 and 2 Castle Gates; 52.71095°N 2.75080°W		Late 17th to early 18th century	Two houses, later a shop, it has a timber framed core, and is in painted brick with a tile roof. There are two storeys and an attic, and four bays. In the ground floor are early 20th-century shop fronts with a fascia on console brackets, and a passage entry to the right. The upper floor contains sash windows, and there are two gabled roof dormers.	II
11 Claremont Hill; 52.70767°N 2.75800°W	—	Late 17th to early 18th century	A timber framed house with a brick front and a tile roof. There are two storeys and an attic, and two bays. The doorway has a moulded architrave, the windows are sashes, and there is a gabled dormer.	II
19, 20 and 20A Mardol; 52.70906°N 2.75612°W	—	1706	A pair of houses, later shops with offices above, in rendered brick with angle quoins, a string course, a moulded modillion eaves cornice, and a tile roof. There are three storeys and attics, and seven bays. In the ground floor is a central round-headed passageway entrance, flanked by 20th-century shop fronts. The middle floor contains casement windows, most of the windows in the top floor are sashes, and there are four hip roofed dormers.	II
9 and 10 Mardol; 52.70856°N 2.75569°W	—	1710	A shop in stuccoed brick, with quoins in the left angle, a coved eaves cornice, and a tile roof. There are three storeys and an attic, and three bays. In the ground floor is a shop front, and above are sash windows in moulded architraves, and two gabled attic dormers. Between the windows is a circular plaque inscribed with initials and the date.	II
45 Pride Hill; 52.70834°N 2.75379°W		1710	A house, later a shop, it is in brick with a string course, an overhanging moulded modillion eaves cornice, and a tile roof. There are three storeys and an attic, and two bays. In the ground floor is a shop front, the upper floors contain sash windows, and there is a dormer with a hipped roof.	II
36 Pride Hill; 52.70847°N 2.75333°W		1712	A house, later a shop, on a corner site. It is in brick with quoins, a string course, a moulded modillion eaves cornice, and a hipped tile roof. There are three storeys and an attic, two bays on Pride Hill and four on Butcher Row. In the ground floor is a shop front, the upper floor contains sash windows with moulded sills, and there are three gabled dormers.	II
29 and 30 Claremont Hill and 1 Barker Street; 52.70790°N 2.75708°W	—	1712	A house, later a shop, on a corner site. It is in brick with quoins, a string course, a moulded dentilled eaves cornice, and a hipped tile roof. There are three storeys, three bays on Claremont Hill, two on Barker Street, and one on the canted corner between. In the ground floor are shop fronts, and above are sash windows with moulded sills.	II
70 Mardol; 52.70851°N 2.75542°W	—	1717	A stuccoed brick shop with angle quoins, a parapet containing recessed panels, one dated, and a tile roof. There are three storeys and three bays. In the ground floor is a shop front, and the upper floors contain sash windows and one blind window.	II
11 St John's Hill; 52.70683°N 2.75741°W	—	c. 1720	A brick house with string courses and a tile roof, two storeys and two bays, the right bay gabled. The doorway has an architrave, and the windows are sashes, the window in the left bay horizontally-sliding.	II
1 and 2 Castle Street; 52.70910°N 2.75239°W	—	1723	A house, later a shop, it is in brick with string courses, and a tile roof with a coped gable on the right. There are three storeys and an attic, and four bays. In the ground floor is a shop front, above are sash windows, there are two gabled dormers, and a datestone in the top floor.	II
37, 38 and 38A Castle Street; 52.70931°N 2.75172°W		1723	A house, later shops, it is in stuccoed brick with angle quoins, a dentilled cornice, and a parapet with ball finials. There are three storeys and five bays. In the ground floor are shop fronts flanked by rusticated pierss and a cornice above. The windows are sashes with moulded sills, recessed aprons, and keystones.	II
28 Claremont Hill and cobbled area 52.70788°N 2.75720°W		1724	A house, later a shop, it is in brick with quoins on the left side, a string course, a moulded modillion eaves cornice, and a tile roof. There are three storeys and attics, and three bays. In the ground floor is a shop front, the upper floors contain sash windows with moulded sills, and there are two pedimented roof dormers. In front there is a cobbled area.	II
3 Barker Street; 52.70809°N 2.75717°W		1725	The building, which was restored in 1935, is in brick with angle quoins, a string course, a modillion eaves cornice, a parapet with urns, and a hipped tile roof. There are three storeys, three bays, and two datestones. In the ground floor is a shop front with a central door, and above are sash windows with keystones.	II
15 and 17 Bellstone and 3 and 4 Claremont Hill; 52.70778°N 2.75706°W		Early 18th century	Three houses, later shops on a corner site, they are in brick and have a hipped tile roof. The front on Bellstone has two storeys and an attic and five bays, on Claremont Hill the first shop has two storeys and an attic and six bays, and the other shop has three storeys and two bays. In the ground floor are shop fronts, the windows are sashes with stepped stuccoed voussoirs, and there are five pedimented dormers, one with a segmental arch.	II
30 Castle Street; 52.70965°N 2.75114°W		Early 18th century	A brick shop with sill bands, a coved eaves cornice, and a hipped tile roof. There are three storeys and an attic, and two bays. In the ground floor is a shop front with a moulded cornice above, in the upper floors are sash windows, and there is a hipped dormer.	II
28 and 29 Mardol; 52.70943°N 2.75669°W		Early 18th century	A pair of brick shops with a moulded eaves cornice, and an overhanging tile roof with coped gables. There are three storeys and attics, and two bays. In the ground floor are late 20th-century shop fronts over which is an earlier fascia with moulded console brackets. The middle floor contains three-light oriel windows with a pediment over the middle light, above which is a continuous cornice. In the top floor are four sash windows, and there are three pedimented attic dormers.	II
46 and 47 Mardol; 52.70953°N 2.75657°W		Early 18th century	A pair of shops, probably with an earlier timber framed core, they are in brick with stone dressings, angle quoins, string courses, a moulded cornice, an eaves parapet, and a tile roof. There are three storeys and five bays. In the ground floor are 20th-century shop fronts, and an arched passageway to the right. The upper floors contain sash windows with keystones, those in the top floor with recessed panels above.	II
53 Mardol; 52.70924°N 2.75605°W	—	Early 18th century	A house and outbuildings, later a shop, it is in painted brick with some exposed timber framing and a tile roof with a coped gable to the right. There are three storeys and an attic, a front of four bays, and at the rear is a wing of 2½ storeys containing a loading door and a dormer, and a further ancillary building at right angles. In the ground floor is a shop front, the upper floors contain sash windows with segmental heads, and there are two attic dormers.	II
69 Mardol; 52.70852°N 2.75542°W	—	Early 18th century	A shop with probably an earlier core, it is in brick over timber framing, with a string course, plain overhanging eaves, and a tile roof. There are three storeys and one bay. The ground floor contains a shop front, in the middle floor is a tripartite window with a scalloped canopy, and the top floor contains a sash window.	II
71 Mardol; 52.70840°N 2.75532°W	—	Early 18th century	A brick shop with angle quoins, a string course, a modillion eaves cornice, and a tile roof. There are three storeys and three bays. In the ground floor is a shop front, and the upper floors contain sash windows with moulded sills.	II
72 and 73 Mardol; 52.70833°N 2.75528°W		Early 18th century	A pair of shops in painted brick with a modillion eaves cornice and a tile roof. There are three storeys and attics, No. 72 has four bays, and No. 73 has one bay. In the ground floor are 20th-century shop fronts, the upper floors contain sash windows, and there are three gabled dormers.	II
7 Mardol Head; 52.70792°N 2.75483°W	—	Early 18th century	A house, later a shop, that has been largely rebuilt. It is in brick with stone dressings, angle quoins, a string course, and a tile roof. There are three storeys and an attic, and three bays. In the ground floor is a modern shop front, the upper floors contain sash windows with cambered heads and stuccoed keystones, and there are two gabled dormers.	II
13 Mardol Head; 52.70821°N 2.75458°W	—	Early 18th century	The shop, which is on a corner site, was refronted in the early 19th century. It is in stuccoed brick, with a string course, a projecting cornice with a moulded architrave, a parapet, and a tile roof with a stepped gable in brick at the rear. In the ground floor is a shop front, and on the return is rusticated stucco. There are three storeys, one bay on Mardol Head, four bays in the right return, and a bay in the canted corner between. The windows are sashes in architraves, those in the middle floor with pediments.	II
12 and 13 Pride Hill; 52.70861°N 2.75348°W	—	Early 18th century	A pair of shops with possibly an earlier core.. They are in brick with a moulded modillion eaves cornice and an overhanging tile roof. There are three storeys and attics, and five bays. In the ground floor are shop fronts. the upper floors contain sash windows, those in the middle floor with moulded architraves and pediments, and those in the top floor with plain architraves, and above are three attic dormers.	II
39 Pride Hill; 52.70844°N 2.75350°W	—	Early 18th century	A house, later a shop, it is in stuccoed brick with a moulded eaves cornice and a tile roof. There are three storeys and an attic, and one bay. In the ground floor is a shop front, the upper floors contain sash windows, and there is a dormer in the roof.	II
1 School Gardens and wall 52.71019°N 2.75091°W	—	Early 18th century	A house, later offices, in brick with a coved eaves cornice and a tile roof. There are two storeys and three bays. The central doorway has a scrolled broken pediment, the windows are sashes, and there are pedimented gabled dormers. At the front of the house are two lengths of brick garden walls with curved stone copings and brick piers with half-sphere finials.	II
13 St John's Hill; 52.70667°N 2.75779°W	—	Early 18th century	A brick house with overhanging eaves, a moulded cornice, and a tile roof with coped gables. There are two storeys an attic and a basement, and three bays. The doorway in the right bay has a lugged architrave, a rectangular fanlight, and a pediment. The windows are sashes, in the ground floor they have shutters, and there are three pedimented dormers.	II
18 St John's Hill; 52.70641°N 2.75816°W	—	Early 18th century	Most of the house, which is on a corner site, dates from the early 19th century. It is in stuccoed brick with a tile roof. The main part has three storeys and a basement, and three bays. The doorway in the left bay has a pediment, and the windows are sashes. The right return forms a wing with two gables and a lower extension. It contains a two-storey square bay window, and beyond is a doorway with a pediment on consoles.	II
30 and 31 St John's Hill; 52.70699°N 2.75743°W		Early 18th century	A pair of brick houses, later offices, with a moulded modillion eaves cornice and a Welsh slate roof. There are two storeys, attics and cellars, and each part has four bays. Each doorway has a traceried fanlight and an entablature on moulded brackets. The windows are sashes, those in the upper floor with segmental heads, and there are four attic dormers with pediments, the outer ones triangular, and the inner ones segmental.	II
Barker's Chambers; 52.70800°N 2.75713°W	—	Early 18th century	The shop and offices were restored in 1937. The building is in brick with a tiled roof. There are three storeys and five bays, the left bay slightly projecting. The other bays contain a shop front and sash windows above. In the left bay is a round-arched doorway with voussoirs and a fanlight. The window above it has a moulded architrave with a keystone, and at the top is a dated cartouche forming an eaves parapet.	II
Claremont House; 52.70798°N 2.75874°W		Early 18th century	A vicarage, later used for other purposes, it is in brick with angle quoins, a moulded cornice, parapet eaves, and a Welsh slate roof. There are three storeys and four bays, the left three bays forming a full-height bow. The doorway in the right bay has a fanlight, a pediment and side lights. The windows are sashes, and on the sides are shaped Dutch gables.	II
Rodney House; 52.71002°N 2.75167°W	—	Early 18th century	A brick house, later offices, with string courses and a tile roof. There are three storeys and an attic, three bays, and a gabled extension. The windows are a mix of sashes and casements, and there are two gabled dormers. The porch has a round arch and stuccoed pilasters.	II
Garage, 13 St John's Hill; 52.70683°N 2.75747°W		Early 18th century	The garage, originally the coach house to Hardwick House, it is in brick with a tile roof. There is one storey with a Dutch gable containing an oculus, and inserted garage doors.	II
Sydney House; 52.71009°N 2.75158°W	—	Early 18th century	The house incorporates parts of the former gaol. It is in brick with sill bands and a Welsh slate roof. There are three storeys and five bays. The doorway has an architrave with Ionic columns, and to its right is a canted bay window. The other windows are sashes. At the rear is an external staircase flanked by canted bay windows, and there are three gabled dormers.	II
The Old Police House; 52.70991°N 2.75152°W	—	Early 18th century	A shop, previously a house, and before that a courthouse and gaol, it is in brick, possibly with an earlier core, and has a tile roof. There are two storeys and a basement, and five bays. The doorway has a traceried fanlight, the windows in the ground floor are sashes with segmental heads, in the upper floor they are mullioned and transomed, some of which are blocked, and there are three dormers.	II
White Hart Hotel; 52.70872°N 2.75583°W	—	Early 18th century	The former public house incorporates earlier material. It is in stuccoed brick, possibly with a timber framed core, and has angle quoins, string courses, and a tile roof. There are three storeys and an attic, and two bays. In the ground floor is a doorway and a shop window to the right, the upper floors contain sash windows, and there is a hip roofed dormer. In the right return are the remains of a moulded bressumer from former jettying.	II
24 and 25 St John's Hill; 52.70679°N 2.75787°W	—	c. 1730	A pair of brick houses with an eaves cornice, and a tile roof with coped gables. There are two storeys and an attic, and five bays. The central entrance has a round arch and a keystone, and it leads to a passage. The windows are sashes with cambered heads, and there are two gabled dormers.	II
28 St John's Hill; 52.70688°N 2.75769°W	—	c. 1730	A brick house with a rendered sill band, a moulded eaves cornice, and a tile roof with coped gables. There are two storeys, an attic and a basement, and four bays. The doorway has an architrave and a round-headed pediment. The windows are sashes, and there are two gabled dormers.	II
29 St John's Hill; 52.70693°N 2.75756°W	—	c. 1730	A brick house with a moulded modillioned eaves cornice and a tile roof. There are two storeys, basements and attics, and three bays. The doorway in the left bay has an architrave, a semicircular fanlight, and a cornice on console brackets. The windows are sashes with cambered heads, and in the attic is a gabled dormer.	II
Summerhouse, 5 Quarry Place; 52.70632°N 2.75943°W	—	Between 1732 and 1739	The summer house in the garden of the house is in brick and has a hipped Welsh slate roof with a weathervane. It has a square plan, one storey, two doorways with segmental pediments on fluted pilasters, and small windows.	II
Two water tanks, Library; 52.71056°N 2.75107°W		1737	The second water tank is dated 1787. They are in lead, and each has decoration in low relief. The decoration on the older tank includes swags, dolphins and Tudor roses, and on the later tank lions rampant and Tudor roses.	II
Hardwick House; 52.70675°N 2.75761°W		c. 1740	A large house in brick with stone dressings and a slate roof. There are two storeys and an attic, and a symmetrical front of five bays. Steps with cast iron railings lead up to a central doorway that has an architrave with Doric pilasters, a triglyph frieze and a flat entablature. At the angles are giant Doric pilasters carrying a cornice above the upper floor. The windows are sashes with tripartite keystones, those in the upper floor with aprons.	II*
13 Castle Street; 52.70968°N 2.75150°W		c. 1750	A house, later a shop, in brick with moulded eaves and a parapet. There are four storeys and two bays. In the ground floor is a shop front, the middle two floors contain sash windows, and in the top floor the windows are casements; all the windows have keystones.	II
36 Castle Street; 52.70935°N 2.75159°W	—	Mid-18th century	A brick shop with a cornice, a parapet and a tile roof. There are three storeys and one bay. In the ground floor is a shop front, and above are sash windows.	II
5 and 6 Claremont Hill; 52.70776°N 2.75733°W	—	18th century	A pair of houses later used for other purposes, in brick with dentilled eaves. There are three storeys and three bays. In the ground floor are shop windows and doorways with round-headed fanlights and pediments. The upper floors contain sash windows, and the middle bay in each floor has a blind window.	II
15 Claremont Hill; 52.70773°N 2.75842°W	—	18th century	The house has an earlier, probably 17th-century core. It is in brick over timber framing and has a tile roof. There are two storeys and two bays. Steps lead up to a doorway on the left with a high relieving arch, and on the right is an arched entrance to a passageway. In the ground floor are bow windows, and the upper floor contains casement windows.	II
17 Claremont Hill; 52.70773°N 2.75825°W	—	18th century	The house has an earlier, probably 17th-century core. It is in brick on a stone plinth, over timber framing, and has a tile roof. There is one storey and an attic, and two bays. The doorway is to the left, on the right is a sash window, and there is an attic dormer.	II
27 Claremont Hill; 52.70786°N 2.75727°W	—	Mid-18th century	A house, later a shop, in brick, with an overhanging moulded eaves cornice and a tile roof. There are three storeys and an attic, and two bays. In the ground floor is a shop front, the upper floors contain sash windows, and there is a gabled dormer.	II
1, 2 and 3 Mardol; 52.70815°N 2.75538°W	—	Mid-18th century	A row of three shops, No. 3 probably later, in brick, partly roughcast and with a tile roof. Nos. 1 and 2 have two storeys, and No. 3 has three, and there are six bays. In the ground floor are shop fronts, and the upper floors contain sash windows.	II
14 Pride Hill; 52.70864°N 2.75335°W		Mid-18th century	The façade was added in about 1850; it is in cast iron imitating stucco, and the roof is in Welsh slate. There are three storeys and an attic, and two bays. The façade contains vermiculated quoins, and a decorative string course and cornice. In the ground floor is a modern shop front, the middle floor contains round-arched windows with architraves and open pediments with foliate decoration and masks. In the top floor are flat-headed windows with architraves, and there are two roof dormers.	II
7 and 8 Quarry Place; 52.70635°N 2.75850°W	—	Mid-18th century	A pair of brick houses with a dentilled eaves band and a tile roof. They have two storeys and attics, and each house has three bays. The doorways have moulded architraves and fanlights, the windows are sashes with segmental heads, and each house has two roof dormers.	II
5 St Chad's Terrace; 52.70641°N 2.75845°W	—	Mid-18th century	A brick house with a string course, a dentilled eaves cornice, and a tile roof. There are two storeys and an attic, and three bays. The doorway has a moulded architrave, there is a tripartite window to the left, and a casement window to the right. The upper floor contains sash windows, and there is an attic dormer.	II
5 and 6 St John's Hill; 52.70713°N 2.75667°W	—	Mid-18th century	A pair of houses, later shops, in brick with a sill band, a tile roof, and an earlier, probably timber framed, core. They have two storeys and an attic, and two bays. In the ground floor are shop fronts, the upper floor contains sash windows, and there are two gabled dormers.	II
10 St John's Hill; 52.70702°N 2.75686°W	—	Mid-18th century	A house, later a shop, in brick with dentilled eaves and a tile roof. There are three storeys and three bays. In the ground floor is a shop front, and the upper floors contain sash windows in the outer bays and painted blind windows in the middle bays, all with cambered heads.	II
Garage, 12 St John's Hill; 52.70671°N 2.75775°W	—	Mid-18th century	The garage, originally a coach house, is to the north of the house. It is in brick with a tile roof and a Dutch gable, and contains inserted garage doors, over which is an oculus.	II
St Chad's Cottage; 52.70818°N 2.75904°W	—	Mid-18th century	A brick house with a tile roof. There are two storeys and an attic, two bays, and a single-storey extension to the left with a doorway approached by steps. The windows are sashes, most of them horizontally-sliding.	II
4 and 5 Quarry Place and railings 52.70604°N 2.75901°W		1757	A pair of houses by Joseph Bromfield with an extension added in about 1800. They are in brick with a parapet eaves cornice. There are three storeys and basements, eight bays on the front, with the extension protruding with two storeys, two bays on Quarry Place and four bays overlooking the park. The doorways have architraves with clustered shafts, fanlights, and hoods on scrolled console brackets, and the windows are sashes with keystones. On the park front is a bow window with Ionic pilasters and a balcony. On the garden front is another bow window and balcony, and a two-storey canted bay window. Enclosing the basement area are cast iron railings.	II
25 and 26 Claremont Hill; 52.70784°N 2.75740°W		1761	A pair of houses, later used for other purposes, they are in brick with a moulded modillion eaves cornice, a parapet, and a tile roof. There are three storeys and attics, and each house has four bays. The doorways have flat hoods on console brackets, and to the right is a shop front that has a fascia with console brackets. The windows are sashes, and there are attic dormers.	II
19–23 St John's Hill; 52.70670°N 2.75804°W		c. 1761	A terrace of five brick houses with a moulded modillioned eaves cornice and a tile roof. There are three storeys and basements, and each house has three bays. Steps lead up to the recessed doorways, the central house has a rectangular fanlight, the others have semicircular fanlights, and all have side lights. The windows are sashes and the basement windows have segmental heads. The middle house has an inserted latticed cast iron balcony and French windows in the middle floor.	II*
26 and 27 St John's Hill; 52.70685°N 2.75773°W	—	1761–62	A pair of brick houses with a moulded modillioned eaves cornice and a tile roof. There are two storeys, basements and attics, each house has three bays and a doorway in the outer bay with a semicircular fanlight. The doorway of No. 26 has a moulded architrave and a cornice on curved console brackets, and the doorway to No. 27 has a lugged architrave. Most of the windows are sashes, and they and the basement windows have cambered heads. In the upper floor of No. 26 is a cast iron balcony and a French window. In the attics are four dormers, the outer ones with triangular, and the inner ones with segmentally-arched pedimented heads.	II
25 and 26 Castle Street and railings 52.70990°N 2.75057°W		Late 18th century	A house later used for other purposes, it is in brick with a stuccoed basement, a string course, and a moulded cornice. There are three storeys, a basement and a small attic, three bays, and a smaller bay recessed on the right. Steps on the front lead up to the doorway that has a panelled architrave and a shallow pediment, and is flanked by canted bay windows. In the middle floor are two Venetian windows in recessed arches with fluted tympana. The windows in the top floor and attic are sashes, and there are blind windows in the middle bays. The right bay contains a lean-to porch that has a doorway with a pedimented hood on console brackets. The basement area is enclosed by cast iron railings.	II
35 and 35A Castle Street; 52.70942°N 2.75153°W	—	Late 18th century	A shop in painted brick with a tile roof. It has a cornice with a high parapet above that contains two rectangular recesses. There are three storeys and an attic, and two bays. In the ground floor is a shop front and a passageway to the right, and above are sash windows and two dormers.	II
8 Claremont Hill; 52.70773°N 2.75765°W	—	Late 18th century	A brick house, possibly with an earlier core, it has a parapet eaves cornice and a tile roof. There are two storeys and three bays. The doorway has panelled rebates, a fanlight, and a pediment, and the windows are sashes.	II
14 Claremont Hill; 52.70758°N 2.75869°W	—	Late 18th century (probable)	A brick house with a tile roof, two storeys and four bays. Steps lead up to the doorway that has an architrave and an entablature with moulded consoles brackets, and the windows are sashes.	II
35 Hill's Lane; 52.70886°N 2.75660°W	—	Late 18th century	A block of shops and offices in stuccoed brick, with a rusticated ground floor, sill bands, a plain eaves band, and a tile roof. There are three storeys with attics, and five bays, the right two bays projecting under a hipped roof. In the ground floor are doorways and shop fronts. The upper floors contain sash windows, one with a segmental pediment, and there are four gabled dormers.	II
7 Mardol; 52.70855°N 2.75567°W		Late 18th century	A brick shop with an eaves cornice and a parapet. There are three storeys and three bays. In the ground floor is a shop front flanked by a doorway on each side. The middle floor contains tripartite sash windows, there are four-pane sash windows in the top floor, and the central bay contains blind windows.	II
68 Mardol; 52.70859°N 2.75547°W	—	Late 18th century	A brick shop with a parapet, three storeys and two bays. In the ground floor is a shop front, and above are sash windows with keystones.	II
4 Pride Hill; 52.70833°N 2.75422°W	—	Late 18th century	A shop in painted brick with a plain eaves cornice and a tile roof. There are three storeys and an attic, and two bays. In the ground floor is a 20th-century shop front, the upper floors contain sash windows, and there is an attic dormer.	II
2 Shoplatch; 52.70777°N 2.75508°W	—	Late 18th century	A brick shop with a sill band, a modillion eaves cornice, and a tile roof. There are four storeys and two bays. In the ground floor is a shop front, and in the upper floors are sash windows, those in the first floor in recessed arches.	II
8 and 9 St John's Hill; 52.70701°N 2.75687°W	—	Late 18th century	A pair of shops with possibly an earlier core. They are in brick with a dentilled eaves band and a tile roof. There are three storeys, and each shop has one bay. In the ground floor are early 20th-century shop fronts. The middle floor contains five-light casement windows, and in the top floor are three-light casement windows.	II
14 St John's Hill; 52.70658°N 2.75786°W	—	Late 18th century	A brick house with a rusticated stuccoed ground floor, a sill band, an eaves band and a parapet. There are three storeys and a basement, and three bays. In the right bay is a recessed round-headed doorway, and the windows are sashes, those in the ground floor with round heads.	II
37 St John's Hill; 52.70718°N 2.75691°W	—	Late 18th century	A brick house with a dentilled eaves cornice and a Welsh slate roof. There are three storeys and one bay. To the left is a doorway with a moulded architrave and a pediment, and the windows are sashes.	II
40, 41 and 42 St John's Hill; 52.70728°N 2.75678°W	—	Late 18th century	A pair of brick houses, later shops, with a Welsh slate roof, three storeys and three bays. In the ground floor is a central doorway with a moulded architrave flanked by shop fronts. The outer bays of the upper floors contain recessed arches. In the middle floor the right bay contains a tripartite sash window, the other bays have inserted mullioned and transomed windows, and in the top floor are sash windows.	II
Statue of the Farnese Hercules; 52.70683°N 2.76362°W		Late 18th century	The statue in The Quarry has been moved from Condover Hall. It is in lead on a stone plinth, and is a copy of the ancient statue known as the Farnese Hercules. It depicts a figure leaning on a club, and there is an inscription on the plinth.	II
6 Quarry Place and railings 52.70620°N 2.75878°W		c. 1778	A brick house, the basement faced in rusticated stone, and with a cornice and a tile roof. There are three storeys and a basement, a double-depth plan, and five bays. The central doorway has a traceried fanlight, a cornice with carved urns, and an open pediment. The windows are sashes, those in the ground floor in carved recesses and with round-arched heads, and the windows above the doorway have architraves. In the garden front are two two-storey canted bay windows flanking a Venetian window, and in front of the basement area are cast iron railings.	II*
St Chad's Church; 52.70736°N 2.75898°W		1790–92	The church was designed by George Steuart in Neoclassical style, and it is built in Grinshill sandstone. The main body of the church is a circular nave. The church is entered through a portico leading to a hall surmounted by a tower and flanked by vestries, and there are apse-ended links for the gallery stairs. The portico has four unfluted Doric columns and a pediment, and the vestries also have pediments. The tower has a square rusticated bottom stage, the belfry stage is octagonal, with Ionic pilasters, above which is a circular stage with detached Corinthian columns carrying an entablature with a dome and a cross. The nave has a rusticated bottom storey with square windows, and above it the main taller storey contains round-headed windows, Ionic pilasters, and a Venetian window for the chancel.	I
Wall, gate piers and railings, St Chad's Church; 52.70706°N 2.75860°W	—	c. 1790	The gate piers are in stone with depressed pyramidal caps, and there are cast iron gates and railings on both sides. To the right is a brick wall with stone coping.	II
1 and 2 Quarry Place and railings 52.70605°N 2.75853°W		c. 1791–93	A pair of brick houses with a sill band, a stuccoed eaves cornice, a parapet, and a Welsh slate roof. There are three storeys and basements, and each house has three bays. The doorways have Doric doorcases and flat entablatures, and the windows are sashes. Enclosing the basement areas are cast iron railings.	II
Claremont Buildings, railings and steps 52.70814°N 2.75937°W		1792–74	A terrace of six houses, later offices, faced in ashlar, the ground floor rusticated, with a cornice over the ground floor, a sill band, a projecting cornice and a parapet at the top, and a mansard roof in Welsh slate. There are three storeys and basements, twelve bays, and two two-bay projecting porches. The openings in the ground floor, doorways with fanlights and sash windows, are all in round-headed recesses. The upper floors also contain sash windows, and there are gabled roof dormers. The basement areas are enclosed by cast iron railings, and there are steps to a raised pavement at the right end of the terrace.	II
13 Claremont Hill; 52.70761°N 2.75812°W		c. 1800	A brick house with a Welsh slate roof, three storeys, and three bays on the west front. Here there is a central doorway with an architrave, a fanlight and an entablature on curved console brackets. The doorway on the north front has a pediment, and the windows are sashes.	II
4 Mardol; 52.70831°N 2.75547°W	—	c. 1800	A shop, possibly refronting an earlier building, it is in brick with plain parapet eaves and a tile roof. There are four storeys and two bays. In the ground floor is a shop front, and above are sash windows.	II
49, 50 and 50A Mardol; 52.70940°N 2.75633°W		c. 1800	A pair of brick shops with a parapet and a tile roof. They have four storeys, and each shop has three bays and sash windows in the upper floors. No. 49 has a moulded eaves cornice, a recessed shop front with a fascia on cast iron columns. In the ground floor of No. 50 is a 19th-century shop front with a bow window.	II
58 and 59 Mardol; 52.70899°N 2.75582°W	—	c. 1800	A brick shop with a modillion eaves cornice and a tile roof. There are three storeys and four bays. In the ground floor is a shop front with a 19th-century fascia on console brackets. The upper floors contain sash windows, those in the top floor with keystones.	II
61 Mardol; 52.70891°N 2.75577°W	—	c. 1800	A shop refronted on an earlier core, it is in brick with a dentilled eaves band and a tile roof. There are three storeys and an attic, and two bays. In the ground floor is a recessed shop front that has a high fascia on moulded console brackets. In the middle floor is an inserted three-light casement window, the top floor contains two sash windows with keystones, and there is a gabled dormer.	II
62 Mardol; 52.70887°N 2.75573°W	—	c. 1800	A shop, probably with an earlier core, it is in brick with a modillion eaves cornice and a tile roof. There are three storeys and two narrow bays. In the ground floor is a shop front with a passage door to the left, and the upper floors contain sash windows with stuccoed heads.	II
76 Mardol; 52.70819°N 2.75513°W		c. 1800	A brick shop with a stuccoed string course and a parapet, three storeys and two bays. In the ground floor is a 19th-century shop front with an arched central window, a doorway on the right and a blocked door on the left. The upper floors contain sash windows.	II
77 and 77A Mardol; 52.70815°N 2.75506°W		c. 1800	A shop with a stuccoed string course and a parapet. There are three storeys and three bays, and in the ground floor is a late 20th-century shop front. The upper floors contain sash windows with stuccoed heads, those in the middle floor being tripartite with keystones.	II
1–4 St Chad's Terrace; 52.70650°N 2.75861°W		c. 1800	A terrace of four brick houses with a dentilled eaves cornice, and a Welsh slate roof with coped gables. There are three storeys and eight bays. The doorways have fanlights and pediments, and in the centre is round-arched passage entry. The windows are sashes, and some windows are blind.	II
2 and 3 St Austin's Friars; 52.70906°N 2.75905°W	—	c. 1800	A pair of brick houses with Welsh slate roofs, three storeys and one bay each. The doorways have fanlights and entablatures on console brackets, and the windows are sashes.	II
38 St John's Hill; 52.70722°N 2.75686°W	—	c. 1800	A house, later a shop, it is in painted brick with dentilled eaves and a Welsh slate roof. There are three storeys and two bays. In the ground floor is a shop front, to the right is a passageway with a round arch and a moulded surround, and in the upper floors are sash windows.	II
Priory Building, Sixth Form College; 52.70908°N 2.76003°W		c. 1800	A house, later part of a school, it is in brick with a hipped Welsh slate roof. There are two storeys, a north front of six bays, and a lower two-storey one-bay extension on the right. On the front is a full-height canted bay window, and to the left is a two-storey square bay window that projects less. The windows are sashes.	II
Bakery, Victoria Quay; 52.70954°N 2.75896°W		1806	Built as barracks, the building was moved from London Road in 1919, and used as a bakery and later a restaurant. It is in brick on a stone plinth, with a cornice, and a Welsh slate roof with pedimented gables. There are two storeys and ten bays, the outer bays projecting, and the other bays divided by pilasters. The windows in the ground floor have round heads, and in the upper floor the heads are flat.	II
2 and 3 School Gardens; 52.71010°N 2.75108°W		1825	Originally a pair of schoolmasters' houses, possibly with an earlier core, they are in Neo-Tudor style. The houses are in brick with a tile roof. There are two storeys and attics, and seven bays, the central bay is narrow, the outer bays project forward, and there are five gables. The main doorways have four-centred arched heads and hood moulds, and there is a narrower door to the right. The windows are mullioned with two lights and hood moulds, and in the centre bay is a blind lancet window, above which is an initialled datestone. In the side is a full-height bay window.	II
3 and 4 Castle Gates; 52.71101°N 2.75079°W		Early 19th century	A pair of houses, later shops, on a corner site, with an earlier core. They are in brick with a moulded dentilled eaves cornice, and a tile roof with coped gables. There are three storeys and an attic, two bays on Castle Gates, and three on Meadow Place. In the ground floor are shop fronts, the middle floor on Castle Gates contains tripartite sash windows, and in the top floor are Diocletian windows.	II
14 Castle Street; 52.70968°N 2.75150°W		Early 19th century	A house, later a shop, with possibly an earlier core. It is stuccoed, with a sill band and a parapet, and has four storeys and two bays. On the ground floor is a shop front, and above are sash windows with moulded architraves.	II
15 Castle Street; 52.70970°N 2.75133°W	—	Early 19th century	A house, later a shop, containing possibly earlier material, it is stuccoed and has an eaves cornice with moulded console brackets, and a parapet. There are three storeys and four bays. In the ground floor are shop fronts and a passage to the rear. The upper floors contain sash windows in architraves. In the middle floor they are set in segmentally-arched arcades, and in the top floor they have decorative iron balconettes.	II
16 and 17 Castle Street; 52.70981°N 2.75123°W	—	Early 19th century	A pair of shops with tile roofs; the shop facing Castle Street has a 20th-century front of applied timber framing over brick. It has two storeys and three bays, the middle bay and the right return are gabled with decorative bargeboards. In the ground floor are shop fronts, a fascia and a cornice, and above are casement windows. The shop facing School Gardens is in painted brick and has three storeys, sash windows, and an oriel window.	II
1–8 Claremont Bank and railings 52.70857°N 2.75891°W		Early 19th century	A terrace of eight houses stepped down a hill in pairs, later used for other purposes, in stuccoed brick, with moulding eaves cornices, parapets, and Welsh slate roofs. They have three storeys and full basements, and each house has three bays. The paired doorways have fluted Doric shafts and fanlights, and the ground floor windows are tripartite with decorated mullions; these are all in shallow arches. The windows in the upper floors are sashes, those in the middle floor in recessed segmental arches. Enclosing the basement areas are cast iron railings.	II*
Garden wall, 13 Claremont Hill; 52.70765°N 2.75838°W	—	Early 19th century	The garden wall is in brick and is about 2.5 metres (8 ft 2 in) high.	II
8 Claremont Street; 52.70802°N 2.75600°W	—	Early 19th century	A shop in painted brick with a Welsh slate roof, three storeys and one bay. In the ground floor is a moulded shop front with a bow window, in the middle floor is a sash window, and the top floor contains a two-light window.	II
17 Hill's Lane; 52.70922°N 2.75741°W	—	Early 19th century	A brick shop with a tile roof, three storeys and two bays. In the ground floor is a shop front and a passage door to the left, and the upper floors contain sash windows of differing sizes.	II
26–34 Hill's Lane; 52.70889°N 2.75695°W		Early 19th century	A terrace of nine brick houses on a convex curve. They have a Welsh slate roof, three storeys, and each house has a double-depth plan and one bay. The doorways have moulded architraves and small canopies, and the windows are sashes.	II
5 Mardol; 52.70836°N 2.75554°W	—	Early 19th century	A brick shop with parapet eaves, four storeys and two bays. In the ground floor is a 20th-century shop front with a fascia on moulded console brackets. The upper floors contain sash windows in moulded architraves.	II
12 and 13 Mardol; 52.70867°N 2.75580°W	—	Early 19th century	A pair of brick shops with an earlier, timber framed, core, a sill band, a moulded cornice, parapet eaves, and a tile roof. There are four storeys and two bays. In the ground floor are 20-century shop fronts, and the upper floors contain sash windows.	II
11 Mardol Head; 52.70812°N 2.75477°W	—	Early 19th century	A brick shop with two stuccoed cornices and an eaves parapet. There are four storeys and three bays. In the ground floor is a 20th-century shop front, and the upper floors contain sash windows and some blind windows.	II
12 Mardol Head; 52.70814°N 2.75465°W		Early 19th century	A brick shop with a stuccoed sill band, a stuccoed modillion eaves cornice, and a parapet. There are three storeys and three bays. In the ground floor are shop fronts, and the upper floors contain sash windows, those in the first floor set in round-arched recesses.	II
6A Pride Hill; 52.70841°N 2.75405°W		Early 19th century	A stuccoed shop with bands, moulded parapet eaves and a parapet. There are four storeys and two bays. In the ground floor is a shop front. The upper floors contain sash windows; in the first floor they have pedimented heads on console brackets, and in the top two floors they have moulded architraves.	II
Coach house and wall, 6 Quarry Place; 52.70630°N 2.75869°W	—	Early 19th century	The coach house is in brick with a modillion eaves cornice and a Welsh slate roof. There are two storeys and front of three bays, the right two bays with a pedimented gable. The windows are sashes, and in front of the coach house is a curved wall with stone coping.	II
7 and 8 Shoplatch; 52.70760°N 2.75546°W		Early 19th century	A pair of shops in painted brick with a tile roof, three storeys and three bays. The left shop has a late 20th-century shop front, the right shop front dates from the later 19th century, and has a fascia on console brackets. The windows are sashes.	II
9 Shoplatch; 52.70755°N 2.75552°W	—	Early 19th century	The building on a corner site, which has been used for various purposes, is in painted brick with parapet eaves and coped gables. There are three storeys and five bays curving round the corner. In the ground floor is an early 20th-century shop front with reeded pilasters and a fascia on consoles. The windows are sashes with moulded sills, and there are some blind windows.	II
8 St Austin's Street and 9 and 10 Claremont Bank; 52.70894°N 2.75883°W	—	Early 19th century	A terrace of three houses on a corner site, in brick with a Welsh slate roof. There are three storeys, one bay on St Austin's Street, two on Claremont Bank, and a curved bay between them. The doors have architraves, those on Claremont Bank being paired, and the windows are sashes.	II
Priory House; 52.70873°N 2.76117°W	—	Early 19th century	A house, later part of a school, in brick with a hipped Welsh slate roof. There are two storeys and a basement, three bays, the outer bays slightly projecting, and a single-bay range to the right. Steps lead up to a doorway with wide architraves and a traceried fanlight, and the windows are sashes.	II
Priory Lodge; 52.70866°N 2.76091°W	—	Early 19th century	A brick house at right angles to the road, with a Welsh slate roof. There are three storeys, three bays, and a lower parallel rear range. In the centre is a two-storey porch with a pedimented doorcase flanked by canted bay windows. The upper floors contain sash windows. The rear range was the coach house and stable, and has inserted double doors and a blocked semicircular window.	II
Shrewsbury Hotel; 52.70949°N 2.75705°W		Early 19th century	The hotel was extended to the left in the later 19th century, and to the right in the 20th century. It is in painted brick with a Welsh slate roof. The original block has four storeys and two wide bays. At the sides are two Doric porches, and a Tuscan colonnade extends from the right porch. In the upper floors are sash windows with segmental arched heads. The left extension has two bays and an oriel window on the front.	II
The Bull's Head Public House and 15 Castle Gates; 52.71129°N 2.75050°W		Early 19th century	A public house with a shop to the right in brick with a plain eaves band and a tile roof. There are three storeys, the public house has three bays, and the shop has one. The ground floor of the public house has rusticated stucco, and a doorway with a reeded architrave, and in the ground floor of the shop is a shop front. The windows are sashes, those in the upper floors with stuccoed heads.	II
Entrance to Victorian Arcade; 52.70927°N 2.75642°W		Early 19th century	The building is in brick with a small cornice and parapet eaves. There are four storeys and four bays. The ground floor contains shop fronts and the entrance to a shopping arcade, over which is a decorative canopy. In the upper floors are sash windows with flat-arched gauged brick heads, and one blind window.	II
Wall, The Old School House; 52.71036°N 2.75104°W	—	Early 19th century	The wall is in painted brick with stone dressings. It has raking coping, and is stepped over a gateway with a four-centred arch.	II
The Castle Vaults Public House; 52.71115°N 2.75049°W		1829	The public house is stuccoed, and has a Welsh slate roof, four storeys and two bays. The doorway at the right has a round-arched head. In the left bay of the first floor is a Venetian window, and the other windows are sashes. The windows in the top two floors of the left bay, which is flanked by pilasters, have round heads, and above the top window is a dated segmental projection.	II
Statue of Sabrina; 52.70691°N 2.76149°W		1842	The statue of Sabrina is by Peter Hollins, it is in The Dingle, The Quarry, and depicts a female figure reclining on a plinth. It was moved to Shrewsbury in 1879.	II
17 and 17A Castle Gates; 52.71106°N 2.75050°W		1844	A stuccoed shop with angle quoins, a modillion cornice, a shaped pediment inscribed with the date, and a Welsh slate roof. There are three storeys and three bays. On the ground floor are shop fronts, and the upper floors contain sash windows, the central window in the middle bay having a moulded architrave and a shallow pediment.	II
34 Castle Street; 52.70946°N 2.75140°W	—	Mid-19th century	A shop on a corner site, it is in brick, with a string course, a modillion eaves cornice, and a hipped tile roof. There are three storeys and an attic, a front of three bays on Castle Street, a curved bay on the corner, and five bays on Windsor Place. In the ground floor are shop fronts and a recessed doorway on the corner, above are casement windows, some blind, and there are two dormers.	II
30 Pride Hill; 52.70867°N 2.75288°W		Mid-19th century	A shop in stuccoed brick with pilasters and a moulded cornice and parapet. On the parapet is a central segmental pediment flanked by balustrading and urns on pedestals, and with an inscribed central panel. In the ground floor are shop fronts. The upper floors contain sash windows with moulded architraves, those in the middle floor with flat heads, and those in the top floor with cambered heads and keystones.	II
3 Quarry Place and stable block 52.70595°N 2.75872°W	—	Mid-19th century	The house is in painted brick with a Welsh slate roof, two storeys and two bays. The doorway and a passage door to the left both have panelled rebates and cornice hoods on bulbous console brackets. To the right is a two-storey canted bay window, and the other windows are sashes. A flat roofed extension to the right connects the house to the stable block that has a hipped roof.	II
8 Mardol; 52.70849°N 2.75563°W	—	c. 1860	At one time the Elephant and Castle Public House, and later a shop, it is in brick with a rusticated ground floor, a sill band, and a dentilled cornice with moulded modillion brackets. There are three storeys and three bays. In the ground floor are three arches, the left a doorway, the middle one a shop window, and at the right is a passage entry. The upper floor contains sash windows with moulded architraves, segmental arches, and keystones.	II
The Hole in the Wall Public House; 52.70780°N 2.75505°W		1863	A purpose-built public house with an ornately decorated front. It is in brick with applied timber framing and plasterwork, and has a tile roof. There are four storeys and one bay. In the ground floor is a canted bay window flanked by doorways. Above this is a cornice and an oriel window with moulded mullions. The top floor is jettied and gabled, with a mullioned window and decorative bargeboards.	II
Former Church of St Nicholas; 52.71003°N 2.75036°W		1870	Originally a Presbyterian church, later used for other purposes, it is built in limestone with tile roofs, and is in Romanesque Revival style. It consists of a tall nave with a clerestory, north and south lean-to aisles, and a small apse. The west end is gabled and has a round-arched doorway, above which is an arcade, a round-arched window, and a circular window in the gable. To the left is a circular stair turret. Along the sides of the aisles are three tiers of round-headed windows, and in the clerestory the windows are circular.	II
67 Mardol; 52.70866°N 2.75549°W		1874	A brick shop with angle quoins, a modillion eaves cornice, and a parapet. There are three storeys and an attic, and three bays. In the ground floor is a shop front, and the upper floors contain sash windows, those in the middle floor with segmental-headed architraves and moulded sills.	II
6 Shoplatch; 52.70764°N 2.75535°W	—	Late 19th century	A shop with possible earlier material in the rear wing. It is in brick with stuccoed angle quoins, a moulded terracotta eaves cornice, and a Welsh slate roof. There are three storeys and an attic, and one bay. In the ground floor is a 20th-century shop front, the first floor contains a wide canted bay window with a dentilled string course above. In the top floot are two sash windows, and in the roof are two gabled dormers with fretted bargeboards.	II
Entrance to The Dingle; 52.70695°N 2.76095°W		Late 19th century	The entrance gate in The Quarry is in stone, and consists of a crocketed ogee arch on traceried piers surmounted by turrets. The wall through the archway is embattled and has traceried panels.	II
Walls and railings, Castle Gardens; 52.71034°N 2.75040°W	—	Late 19th century (probable)	The retaining wall is in sandstone with a projecting cornice band. On the wall are cast iron railings, and at the ends are octagonal stone piers.	II
Statue of Eagle; 52.70688°N 2.76094°W	—	Before 1877	The statue is in The Dingle, The Quarry, and was placed here in 1877. It is in stone and consists of an eagle on a plinth.	II
Bandstand; 52.70620°N 2.76160°W		1879	The bandstand in The Quarry has cast iron columns, a wrought iron roof, and a stone base. The base is circular and the canopy is octagonal. The columns have decoration in low relief, elaborate capitals and spandrels, and the canopy has a scalloped eaves cornice and a weathervane.	II
Gates and gate piers, Quarry Place; 52.70592°N 2.75897°W	—	c. 1880	The gates are in cast and wrought iron and are ornate with octagonal shafts, twisted finials, and coats of arms. The gate piers are in stone, and have moulded panels and pyramidal copings.	II
Main gates, The Quarry; 52.70746°N 2.75946°W		1881	The gates at the entry to the park are in cast and wrought iron, There are double gates in the centre and smaller gates outside, between which are piers with traceried panels, coats of arms, and crocketed caps. On the central gates are ornate panels, and the outer gates have scrolled decoration.	II
Southeastern gates and piers, The Quarry; 52.70667°N 2.75878°W	—	c. 1881	The gate piers are in stone and have recessed decorative panels and scrolled console brackets carrying pyramidal caps. The gates are paired and are decorated with scrolls and shields.	II
5 Shoplatch; 52.70766°N 2.75529°W	—	1882	A shop with possible earlier material in the rear wing. It is in brick with stone dressings, and has a Welsh slate roof with a coped gable to the right. There are four storeys and an attic, and two bays. In the ground floor is a shop front, and above are two canted oriel windows with a balustrade, containing mullioned and transomed windows, and flanked by polygonal pilasters. The top floor contains four sash windows in moulded architraves, and at the top is a pedimented Dutch gable containing a sash window.	II
Lodge, The Quarry; 52.70760°N 2.75960°W		1885	The lodge at the entrance to the park has two storeys, the ground floor is in Ruabon brick, the upper floor is timber framed, and the roof is tiled with a crested ridge and finials. The entrance front has two bays, with a canted bay window, mullioned and transomed windows, and a gabled porch with a swan finial. The front facing the street has three bays and contains two parallel gables and casement windows.	II
Fountain, The Dingle; 52.70653°N 2.76062°W		1889	The fountain is in a garden in The Quarry, and is in cast iron. It has a circular basin with shell motifs, and in the centre is a pedestal with lion heads and dolphins carrying the figure of a boy.	II
Statue of Charles Darwin; 52.71043°N 2.75080°W		1897	The statue of Charles Darwin is by Horace Montford and is in the grounds of the former Shrewsbury School, where he had been a pupil. It consists of a bronze statue of a seated Darwin, on a polished granite plinth on two steps.	II
18 and 19 Castle Gates; 52.71091°N 2.75057°W		c. 1900	A pair of shops with a hotel above, with applied timber framing, a coved eaves cornice, and a Welsh slate roof. There are three storeys and attics, and five bays. In the ground floor are two shop fronts flanked by doorways under a continuous fascia on console brackets. The middle floor has two oriel windows containing mullioned and transomed windows. The top floor is jettied with a moulded bressumer, and it contains casement windows and balustraded decoration. In the roof are two gabled dormers with bargeboards and pendant finials.	II
20 Castle Gates; 52.71084°N 2.75059°W		c. 1900	A shop with applied timber framing and a tile roof, three storeys and one bay. In the ground floor is a shop front with curved windows, and the middle floor contains an oriel window. The top floor is jettied with a bressumer on moulded consoles, and contains a mullioned and transomed window. The gable has carved bargeboards.	II
Former Blower's Repository; 52.71090°N 2.75084°W		1902	The building, later used as a library, is in stone and brick with applied timber framing. To the left is a full height stone porch that has an archway and above is a mullioned and transomed window. The right part has applied timber framing on brick, two storeys and a gabled attic. Both storeys are jettied, and below the attic is a moulded bressumer. In the ground floor is a shop front with a fascia and moulded consoles, the middle floor contains an oriel window, and in the attic are paired three-light casement windows.	II
Boer War Memorial; 52.70687°N 2.75905°W		c. 1902	The war memorial stands in a position overlooking The Quarry. It is in stone and consists of a stepped base and a chamfered plinth on which is a statue of a soldier standing, looking downward, and leaning on a rifle. On the plinth are a bust of Queen Victoria in low relief, the dates of the Boer War, and the names of those lost in the conflict. The memorial is surrounded by cast iron railings.	II
1, 2 and 3 Mardol Head; 52.70808°N 2.75437°W		1903	Offices, later a shop, on a corner site, it is in brick with ashlar facing and has a Welsh slate roof. There are three storeys, three bays on Mardol Head, one on High Street, and a curved bay on the corner. On the Mardol Head front is an oriel window with a scrolled pediment, and on the corner is another oriel window, which is curved, over which is mullioned and transomed window with a balcony, and a ribbed domed lead roof. The ground floor contains a shop front, and the building is surmounted by a cupola with balusters carrying a ribbed dome.	II
Wall, The Quarry; 52.70696°N 2.75915°W	—	1906	The wall runs along the west side of the park, it is in stone and about 30 metres (98 ft) long. On the wall, balustrades alternate with solid panels, all with shallow pyramidal copings, and they are divided by piers with double chamfered caps. There are two bowed sections projecting into the park, and in the centre is a raised section of parapet with an inscription.	II
7, 8 and 9 Pride Hill; 52.70849°N 2.75394°W		1907	A shop that was extended in 1920, and later rebuilt behind the shop front. It has applied timber framing, an egg-and-dart cornice above the ground floor, a brick pilaster, and a tile roof. There are three storeys and attics, and three gabled bays. In the ground floor are recessed shop fronts, and the upper storeys are carried on panelled piers. The upper floors contain two-storey canted bay windows, and in the attics are casement windows. Between the floors are plaster panels with dates and coats of arms, and the gables are overhanging on massive brackets.	II
13 Castle Gates; 52.71138°N 2.75043°W		1908	A shop with applied timber framing and a tile roof. There are three storeys and an attic, and one bay. In the ground floor is a 20th-century shop front, there are oriel windows in the upper two floors, and a three-light mullioned window in the jettied gable.	II
Shrewsbury Sixth Form College, Main Building; 52.70881°N 2.76019°W		1910–11	The school, designed by Frank Shayler in English Baroque style, is in brick with stone dressings, angle quoins, a modillion eaves cornice, and hipped Westmorland slate roofs. There are two storeys, a double depth plan, and a symmetrical front of 26 bays and projecting flanking pavilions. Three two-bay blocks project slightly and have pediments, the central with a segmental head, and the other triangular. The doorways have moulded architraves, with a keystone, over which is an inscribed panel flanked by swags. The windows are sash windows, those in the ground floor with segmental heads and keystones. On the pavilions and the rear range are cupolas.	II
Shropshire War Memorial; 52.70741°N 2.76001°W		1922	The war memorial in The Quarry consists of a rotunda by George Hubbard in Portland stone, containing a bronze statue of St Michael by Allan G. Wyon. The rotunda is circular, with six Ionic columns carrying an entablature with an inscribed frieze, and a domed canopy. This stands on a three-stepped granite plinth, and is surrounded by a bronze railings. The figure of the saint is dressed in armour, holding a lance with a pennant, and with a halo and wings. On the floor surrounding the statue are six hexagonal plaques with inscriptions and coats of arms on a background of gold mosaic.	II*
54 Mardol; 52.70930°N 2.75616°W	—	Early 20th century	A shop with applied timber framing and a Welsh slate roof. There are two storeys and three gabled bays. In the ground floor is a shop front and a passageway to the right.	II
National Westminster Bank; 52.70786°N 2.75493°W		1926	The bank, which is in Neo-Renaissance style, is in brick with stone dressings, quoins, a cornice, a parapet, and a hipped roof. There are three storeys and three bays. The ground floor is rusticated, and has an arcade of three arches with voussoirs. The central arch contains a doorway with an ornate cast iron fanlight, and the outer bays contain windows. The windows in the middle floor have moulded architraves and balustraded aprons, the central window with an enriched pediment. The windows in the top floor have moulded architraves, and all the windows and the doorway have decorative keystones.	II
The Morris Hall, wall and gate 52.70749°N 2.75741°W	—	1933	A public hall, partly timber framed on sandstone blocks, and partly in brick with limestone dressings, with a Broseley tile roof. It is in four parts; at the north end is a hall in medieval style, a narrower linking section with a porch leads to a south block in Tudor style, and to the west is a flat-roofed block. The boundary wall to the east is in red sandstone, and the gate posts have chamfered limestone caps and each is surmounted by a lantern.	II
Gala Bingo Club; 52.71127°N 2.75100°W		1934–37	Originally a cinema designed by Cecil Masey with the interior by Theodore Komisarjevsky, it is built in brown brick and white tile with stone dressings and a parapeted roof, and is in Classical style. On the front are four giant Corinthian columns and pilasters carrying an entablature, and at the top is a cornice of acanthus leaves. Behind is a range with two storeys, nine bays on Castle Gates, with shop fronts in the ground floor and mainly round-headed windows in the upper floor.	II
Telephone kiosk near 22 Castle Street; 52.71016°N 2.75065°W	—	1935	A K6 type telephone kiosk, designed by Giles Gilbert Scott. Constructed in cast iron with a square plan and a dome, it has three unperforated crowns in the top panels.	II
Eagle House; 52.70828°N 2.75735°W		1940	An office building in applied timber framing with a tile roof, three storeys and one bay. In the ground floor is a shop front with fluted pilasters and a frieze on consoles, and flanking doorways. The upper storeys are jettied with moulded bressumers. In the middle floor is a canted oriel window, and the top floor contains a mullioned four-light window. At the top is a gable with ornate bargeboards and an eagle finial.	II
3 and 4 St John's Hill; 52.70717°N 2.75659°W	—	Undated	A pair of houses, later a shop, it is timber framed and refaced in brick, and has a tile roof. There are two storeys and an attic, and three bays. In the ground floor is a passageway at the left, and to the right is a shop front, a doorway with a small pedimented hood, and a sash window. In the upper floor are three sash windows, and in the attic are two gabled dormers. There is exposed timber framing in the left gable end.	II

== See also ==
- Listed buildings in Shrewsbury (southeast central area)
- Listed buildings in Shrewsbury (outer areas)

== See also ==
- Listed buildings in Shrewsbury (southeast central area)
- Listed buildings in Shrewsbury (outer areas)
