= Newport House, Shrewsbury =

Municipal building in Shrewsbury, Shropshire, England

Newport House
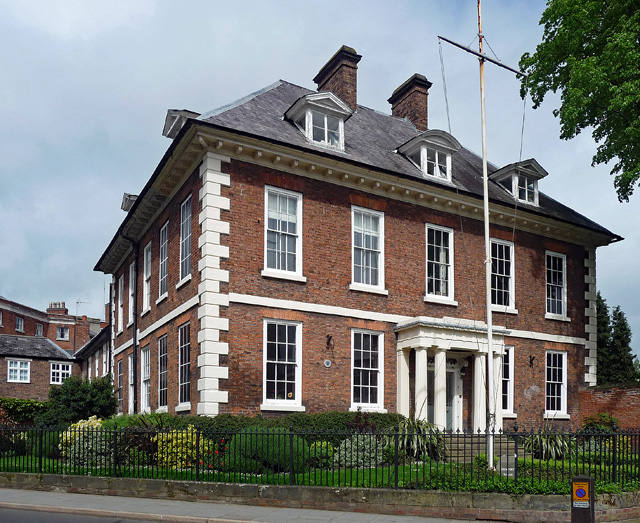
- Newport House

- Shown in Shropshire
- 52.7076°N 2.7510°W
- Location: Dogpole, Shrewsbury

History
- Built: 1696

Listed Building – Grade II*
- Designated: 17 November 1995
- Reference no.: 1270999

Newport House, formerly the Guildhall, is a former municipal building in Dogpole, Shrewsbury, England. It is a Grade II* listed building. The boundary wall is separately listed.

== History ==
The site on which the current building stands had previously been occupied by a 16th-century mansion known as Castle Gates House, which was dismantled and moved to a new location near Shrewsbury Castle. The current building, which was designed for Francis Newport, 1st Earl of Bradford, was completed in 1696. A porch with the Doric columns was added in the 19th century. Newport's grandson, Henry Newport, the 3rd Earl, leased it to Anne Smyth who became the mistress of William Pulteney, 1st Earl of Bath.

The house was then passed down through the Pulteney family until it was inherited by William Pulteney who lived in it for a few years in the early 19th century, when he was serving as the local member of parliament. In 1810 Earl of Darlington successfully laid claim to the Pulteney Estate after the Countess of Bath died intestate in 1808. Newport House was then bought by William Hazledine, a Coleham ironmaster in 1821 and subsequently acquired by a Mr John Hughes in the 1840s. In the late 19th century it served as the home of Edward Burd, a surgeon at the Salop Infirmary.

In 1917 Newport House was acquired by the municipal borough of Shrewsbury, which had previously used part of the Shire Hall in the Market Square as its meeting place. The building continued to be the local seat of government after the enlarged Shrewsbury and Atcham Borough Council was formed in 1974 until the council decided to move to modern facilities at Frankwell Quay in Frankwell in 2004. The opportunity was taken at the time to carry out an archaeological survey which identified a sherd dating back to the late Saxon era. Newport House was subsequently converted back for residential use as a family home.

== See also ==
- Listed buildings in Shrewsbury (southeast central area)
