= Town Walls Tower =

Medieval watchtower in Shrewsbury, Shropshire, England

Coordinates: 52.7053°N 2.7559°W

- Part of Shrewsbury Town Walls
- Shrewsbury, Shropshire in England
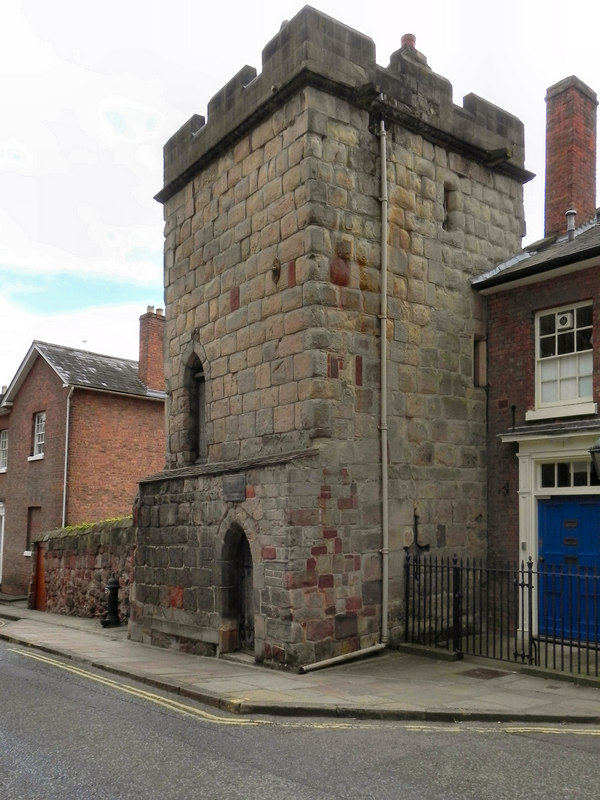

Site information
- Type: Defensive tower
- Owner: National Trust
- Controlled by: Shrewsbury High School
- Open to the public: Open days only
- Condition: Preserved

Location
- Height: 9 m (30 ft)

Site history
- Built: 13th-14th century
- In use: 13th-15th century
- Materials: Sandstone
- Events: Welsh Wars

Town Walls Tower (officially Wingfield's Tower) is the last remaining medieval watchtower belonging to the former town walls of Shrewsbury, Shropshire, England. The fortified structure, which was finished in the 14th century, was used to observe the land south of the town and across River Severn. It is under the care of the National Trust.

== History ==
Shrewsbury town walls were completed in stone in the 13th century replacing earlier ramparts. Work to fortify the settlement had started immediately after the Angles, under King Offa of Mercia, took possession in 778 CE. A century later the Anglo-Saxons had strengthened the town earthworks with a wide ditch and rampart that was topped with a wooden stockade. Most of the early defences were adjacent to the river because its size, depth and limited crossing points provided a substantial defence to direct attack.

In 1070 the Normans started Shrewsbury Castle at the north end of the settlement but did not alter the settlement's outer defences.

However, by early 13th century, military action was increasing between the Welsh and the English. In 1215 Llywelyn ap Iorwerth overran the Anglo-Saxon earthworks and ramparts, sacking and burning Shrewsbury. This prompted Henry III in 1218 to command the town's aldermen to improve its defences. Through murage, the town walls were extended, upgraded and repaired, watch towers were added and new gates with towers were also installed (the North Gate was given a drawbridge). The walls, which were 1.8 m (5 ft 11 in) thick, were constructed from sandstone; a plinth was built into the base of its outer face and there was an external ditch. By 1242, further work had added an outer earthen bank that was 2 m (6 ft 7 in) high and 9 m (30 ft) wide.

During this period the Town Walls Tower would have been used by the town garrison to watch the surrounding area for Welsh incursions and raids. However, after the pacification of the Welsh by Edward I, Shrewsbury's strategic importance declined on the Welsh Marches. By the mid 14th century, the diminished military importance of the walls and towers no longer justified their upkeep, although this tower was remodelled (to its final size) during the reign of Henry IV. By the 15th century, wooden houses were being built behind and on the wall by townspeople. Some sections behind Pride Hill and Castle Street were demolished. The stone was reused in town house foundations. By 1580, the tower had become known as Waring's Tower after the Waring family who leased it from the town corporation. It was later called Wingfield's Tower after another occupant.

Throughout the late 18th century the remaining parts of Shrewsbury town walls were demolished and the gateways removed. The Town Walls Tower survived because it remained in use. In 1816 the tower was the workshop of a watch maker named John Massey. In the 1860s, it was converted into a dwelling for the coachmen of John Humphreys, who lived opposite the tower in Swan Hill Court. His daughter Rachel Humphreys donated the tower to the National Trust in 1930. Between 1930 and 1937 her gardener and his wife lived in the tower. From 1937 to 1954 it was occupied by Mrs. Janet Mitchell. From 1954 to 1967 it was occupied by Mrs. B Curtis. From 1968 to 2012 it was leased by Mr and Mrs Hector. It is now leased by Shrewsbury High School and conserved by the National Trust, which uses the tower as a holiday let although the tower continues to be open to the public for pre-booked guided tours at least three weekends a year.

== See also ==
- Listed buildings in Shrewsbury (southeast central area)
