= Listed buildings in Shrewsbury (southeast central area) =

Shrewsbury is a civil parish in Shropshire, England. It contains nearly 800 listed buildings that are recorded in the National Heritage List for England. Of these, 14 are listed at Grade I, the highest of the three grades, 71 are at Grade II*, the middle grade, and the others are at Grade II, the lowest grade.

Shrewsbury is the county town of Shropshire, it is a market town and the commercial centre for the county and for mid-Wales. It stands on the River Severn, and its centre is almost surrounded by a large curve in the river. The oldest substantial surviving buildings in the town are Shrewsbury Castle and Shrewsbury Abbey, together with a number of churches and the town walls. The town flourished commercially during the 13th century, mainly from the wool trade, and a number of friaries were founded. Two major bridges were built, the Welsh Bridge at the north of the town, linking its centre with the suburb of Frankwell, and the English Bridge to the east, linking with the abbey and the suburb of Abbey Foregate. Following a decline in fortune during the 15th century, trade revived in the later 16th century, mainly from Welsh cloth, and impressive houses were built, most of which were timber framed. There was particular growth during the 18th century, when more impressive properties and public buildings were constructed, now in brick. A public park was created on the site of a former quarry, and named appropriately The Quarry. There was little heavy industry in the town, but at the end of the 18th century Ditherington Flax Mill was built, the first fully iron-framed building in the world. At the same time, the Shrewsbury Canal was opened, and the railway arrived in the town in 1848. There was further development during the 19th century in the town centre and the suburbs. Shrewsbury School, originally a grammar school in the town centre, moved to a new site south of the river in 1882, and has become an independent school. During the 20th century there has been continuing development in and around the town.

Due to the large number of listed buildings, they have been divided into three lists, based on geographical areas. The central area of the town is almost surrounded by the river, and this has been split into two lists, divided by the roads running from the southwest to the northeast, named respectively St John's Hill, Shoplatch, Pride Hill, Castle Street, Castle Gates, and Castle Foregate. The other list contains the listed buildings in the areas outside the central area. This list contains the listed buildings in the area to the southeast of the named roads, but not including the buildings on those roads. Most of these are houses and associated structures, public houses and hotels, shops and offices. The most important early buildings, all listed at Grade I are Shrewsbury Castle, St Mary's Church, and the Old Market Hall. The other listed buildings include remaining parts of the town walls, other churches, banks, a folly, former warehouses, the railway station, Shrewsbury Cathedral, a hospital, and a pillar box.

== Key ==
Grade	Criteria
I	Buildings of exceptional interest, sometimes considered to be internationally important
II*	Particularly important buildings of more than special interest
II	Buildings of national importance and special interest

== Buildings ==
Name and location	Photograph	Date	Notes	Grade
Remains of Old St Chad's Church; 52.70639°N 2.75313°W		12th century	The remains of the church consist of the south chancel chapel. The north and west walls are in red sandstone, the south and east walls, which date from about 1496, are in buff Grinshill sandstone, and the roof is of Welsh slate. There is an arch in the west wall within a larger wide blocked arch, and to the south is the stair turret of the transept. The windows are in Decorated style.	II*
St Julian's Church; 52.70719°N 2.75213°W		12th century	The oldest part of the church is the base of the tower, with the upper parts added in the 15th century. The nave and chancel were rebuilt in 1749–50 by Thomas Farnolls Pritchard, and alterations were carried out to the south wall in 1846. The church is built in sandstone, and has a Welsh slate roof. It consists of a nave, a chancel, and a west tower with porches to the north and south. The tower has a clock face on the south side, a quatrefoil frieze with gargoyles, a parapet, and pinnacles. Along the sides of the nave are round-arched windows, Doric pilasters, a triglyph entablature and a balustrade, and at the east end is a Venetian window.	II*
St Mary's Church, Shrewsbury; 52.70874°N 2.75129°W		12th century	The church was extended and altered during the following centuries, it was restored by Thomas Telford in about 1792, and there were further restorations in the 1850s and 1860s by S. Pountney Smith. The church is built in red and white sandstone and has lead roofs, and consists of a nave with a clerestory, north and south aisles, north and south transept chapels, a chancel with a south chapel, and a west steeple. The steeple has a four-stage tower with a west doorway, above which is a round-arched window and a clock face. At the top is an embattled parapet with traceried finials and a turret, and it is surmounted by a spire with three tiers of lucarnes. The east window has seven lights.	I
Shrewsbury Castle; 52.71124°N 2.74982°W		Late 12th century	What remains of the castle are parts of the curtain wall, the gateway and the main hall, all in red sandstone. The main hall was converted into living accommodation in 1787 by Thomas Telford, and then into a museum in 1924–25 by Sir Charles Nicholson. The hall has three storeys and six bays and an embattled parapet. In the ground floor is a doorway and paired lancet windows, the middle floor contains windows with pointed arches and Y-tracery, and in the top floor are square windows. There are two polygonal towers, one at the western angle and one to the northeast, and in the right bay steps lead up to a doorway in the middle floor. The gateway has a moulded arch, and the curtain wall has retained some crenellations.	I
St Mary's Water Gate; 52.70938°N 2.74955°W		13th century	The gateway and flanking walls, which were originally part of the town walls, are in red sandstone. The gateway has an arch that is chamfered and pointed towards the river, and chamfered and segmental-headed towards the town. On the river side are buttresses, and above the arch is a later brick wall about 1.5 metres (4 ft 11 in) high.	II
Town walls 52.70523°N 2.75360°W		13th century	The town walls are in sandstone, and are mainly retaining walls, ending in a parapet with raking coping. The walls incorporate a plaque inscribed with details of repairs in 1740.	II*
Town walls and attached building 52.70933°N 2.74992°W		13th century (probable)	The remains of part of the medieval red sandstone town walls, some of which have been incorporated in a building. The building has a single storey, a Welsh slate roof, and the remains of a finial on a gable.	II
Town wall south of Beeches Lane; 52.70575°N 2.75048°W	—	13th century (probable)	The section of the town wall is in red sandstone and is about 3 metres (9.8 ft) high. It contains two buttresses with chamfered plinths.	II
Hall of Vaughan's Mansion; 52.70692°N 2.75514°W	—	13th century	The hall has been incorporated in the Music Hall. It is in sandstone and brick and has a tile roof, and consists of a hall and a cross-wing. The hall has a hammerbeam roof and a quatrefoil frieze, mullioned and transomed windows, and dormers in the roof.	II*
Watch Tower and wall 52.70538°N 2.75616°W		13th century	The Watch Tower in Town Walls is in sandstone, and has three storeys and a square plan. There is a doorway in the projecting ground floor, and another doorway in the middle floor with a moulded arched head. The tower contains arrow slits, other small openings, and has an embattled parapet. A length of the town walls adjoins to the left.	II*
8–15 St Alkmond's Place; 52.70792°N 2.75283°W		Late 14th century	A row of cottages, later used for other purposes, the building is timber framed with a Welsh slate roof. Most of it dates from the 16th century, the oldest part being a hall, which forms the west wing. There are three storeys to Fish Street and two on St Alkmond's Place, the main range of three bays spanning the steps between the two, and the upper storeys on Fish Street jettied. In the rear gable facing Fish Street is a recessed gallery, and there are two gabled dormers.	II*
Building to rear of Nag's Head Public House; 52.70649°N 2.75006°W	—	c. 1400	The remains of a timber framed house with a tile roof. It has two storeys and a front of three bays.	II
12 and 12A Fish Street; 52.70799°N 2.75280°W	—	15th century	A house, later a shop, with a 19th-century front and an earlier core. It is in brick with exposed timber framing above, and has a tile roof. There are two storeys and an attic, and four bays. In the ground floor are mullioned and transomed windows, the upper floor contains casement windows, and above are two gabled attic dormers.	II
71, 72 and 73 Wyle Cop; 52.70633°N 2.75113°W		15th century	A house, also known has Henry Tudor House, later two shops, timber framed with a tile roof. It is on a sloping site, with three storeys in the upper part, four in the lower part, and a passageway between the parts. There are four bays, and in the ground floor are shop fronts. The top floor has a coved jetty with moulded brackets. Above the passageway is an oriel window, and the other windows are mullioned or mullioned and transomed. On the front is a plaque recording that Henry VII stayed in the building in 1485 before the Battle of Bosworth Field.	I
Council House Cottage; 52.70957°N 2.74981°W	—	15th century	The house, formerly part of the Old Council House, was altered in the 17th and 19th centuries. It is in stone and brick, and has a tile roof and two storeys. The windows are sashes, those in the upper floor with segmental-arched heads.	II*
The Abbot's House; 52.70812°N 2.75289°W		1457–59	A row of three timber framed shops with living accommodation above, they have a tile roof, three storeys and five bays, the left bay gabled. Each storey is jettied with moulded bressumers. In the ground floor are the original shop fronts with an interlace frieze above each doorway. The middle three bays of the middle floor contain canted oriel windows, and in the outer bays are projecting casement windows on brackets. In the top floor are casement windows, and the windows are similar in the left return.	I
Old Post Office Inn; 52.70671°N 2.75245°W		Mid-to late 15th century	A house, later a shop, the oldest part is the rear wing, and most of the building dates from the early to mid-16th century. It is timber framed with a tile roof, two storeys and attics, four bays with three gables, and a two-storey rear wing. In the ground floor are shop fronts and a passage to the rear on the left. The upper floor contains sash windows with moulded surrounds, in the attics are casement windows, and the gables have carved bargeboards.	II*
The Old Council House; 52.70960°N 2.74979°W		Mid-to late 15th century	A house, at one time a bishop's palace (official residence), later divided into apartments. It was extended in the 17th century and again, more extensively, in 1815. The older parts are in sandstone, the later parts are in brick, and the roof is tiled. The building is in two and three storeys, and the plan consists of a long range of eleven bays facing southeast, a gabled timber framed porch and a northwest wing, and two further parallel wings. The doorway has a four-centred arch with an inscription in the tympanum. Most of the windows are mullioned, some with hood moulds, and other features include bay windows, and gables with fretted bargeboards.	II*
St Alkmund's Church; 52.70765°N 2.75225°W		c. 1472	The oldest part of the church is the steeple, the rest being rebuilt in 1794–95 in Gothic style. The church is built in sandstone with lead roofs, and consists of a nave with north and south aisles, a southwest porch, a short chancel with a north porch and a south vestry, and an embraced west steeple. The steeple is in Perpendicular style, and has a tower with four stages, angle buttresses rising to crocketed pinnacles, a west doorway above which is a four-light window and a bell opening of three lights, and a parapet with pierced tracery. The tall spire has three tiers of lucarnes. There is cast iron tracery in the west and east windows.	II*
2 St Alkmond's Square; 52.70776°N 2.75186°W	—	Late 15th century (probable)	The house possibly has a timber framed core, and the front dates from the 18th century. It is stuccoed over brick, with angle quoins, a moulded cornice forming a parapet, and a tile roof. There are two storeys and an attic, three bays, and a parallel rear range. The recessed doorway has a reeded architrave and a fanlight, and the windows are sashes. Above the right bay is a gable with a casement window, bargeboards, and a pendant finial.	II
2 and 3 Fish Street; 52.70749°N 2.75268°W		Late 15th century	Two cottages, later one house, it is timber framed, partly rendered and with a tile roof. There are two storeys, three bays, and a parallel rear range. The windows are casements, the upper floor is jettied with a plain bressumer, and there is a dormer with a hipped roof.	II
9 and 10 Fish Street; 52.70775°N 2.75290°W	—	Late 15th century	A house, at one time an inn, it is timber framed, the ground floor replaced in brick, and has a tile roof. There are two storeys and an attic, the upper storey slightly jettied, and six bays. In the ground floor are inserted windows, the upper floor contains six mullioned and transomed windows, and there are two tall gabled dormers.	II
14 St Mary's Street; 52.70763°N 2.75160°W	—	Late 15th century (probable)	A house, later offices, it is timber framed and plastered with applied timber framing, and has a tile roof. There are two storeys and two bays. In the ground floor is a doorway to the right, and a square bay window with a hipped roof to the left, and the upper floor contains two casement windows.	II*
65–69 Wyle Cop; 52.70627°N 2.75065°W		Late 15th century	A row of five timber framed shops with living accommodation above on a sloping site. They have a tile roof, and most have three storeys. In the ground floor are shop fronts and an arched passageway. The middle floor contains sash windows in No. 65, and oriel windows in Nos. 66–68, and in the top floor are casement windows. The upper two storeys are jettied, and there are two gabled dormers. No. 69 has two storeys and a wide jettied and gabled attic, with bargeboards and a finial.	II*
Nag's Head Public House; 52.70638°N 2.75040°W		Late 15th century	The public house was altered in the late 19th century. It is timber framed with brick infill, plastered, and has a tile roof. There are three storeys, a front of one bay, and a rear wing with two storeys. In the ground floor is a public house front with a doorway to the left and a three-light window to the right. The middle floor is jettied with a quatrefoil and dentilled frieze and a bressumer. The middle floor contains small-paned casement windows. The top floor is also jettied and contains a horizontally-sliding sash window.	II
The Lion Hotel; 52.70657°N 2.75143°W		Late 15th century	The hotel has three blocks, the oldest being in the centre, with the right block added in the late 18th century, and the left block in about 1800. The central block is in stuccoed timber framing with a tile roof, and the others are in brick with parapets. The central block has three storeys, two bays, sash windows with traceried glazing, and a recessed balcony in the middle floor. The right block has four storeys and six bays, a doorway with Doric columns carrying an entablature with a statue of a lion, and a carriage entry to the right. The left block has two storeys and four bays, a doorway with an open pediment, and round-arched windows in the ground floor.	I
The Old House; 52.70718°N 2.75078°W	—	Late 15th century	The house has been altered and extended through the centuries. The older parts are timber framed with two storeys and attics, the later part is in brick with two storeys, and the roofs are tiled. The plan consists of a main range, and two cross-wings extending to the street. The main range and the south wing are the oldest. The doorway in the main range has ornately carved posts, there is balustraded decoration above, a mullioned and transomed window in each floor, and mullioned windows in the gables. The rear has been refronted in brick, and has doorways with moulded architraves, and sash windows. The south wing has mullioned windows and a canted bay window in the front facing the street. The north wing dates from about 1800, and has two bays and sash windows.	II*
The Trotting Horse Building; 52.70619°N 2.75127°W	—	Late 15th century	A house, at one time an inn, it is timber framed with a tile roof. There are two storeys and five bays. Each floor is jettied on brackets, there are three doorways, and the windows are casements.	II
Three Fishes Public House; 52.70756°N 2.75272°W		Late 15th century	A private house, later a public house, it is timber framed, the ground floor rendered, and with a tile roof. There are two storeys, the upper storey jettied, two bays, and a parallel rear range. The windows are casements, those in the upper floor forming a continuous band.	II
Wesley House; 52.70745°N 2.75259°W	—	Late 15th century	A pair of houses with a timber framed core, in brick, painted in the ground floor and rendered in the upper floor, and with a tile roof. There are two storeys, three bays, and a parallel rear range. On the front are two doorways with canopies, the windows in the ground floor are sashes, and in the upper floor they are casements. The brickwork is exposed in the left gable end.	II
20–25 St Julian's Friary; 52.70506°N 2.74897°W		c. 1520	A group of cottages built around the remains of a Franciscan friary, built in sandstone and brick with some timber framing, and with tile roofs. Nos 23–25 form the main range and have one storey and attics, and three bays. The doorways have fanlights, the windows contain Perpendicular tracery, and there are three roof dormers. Nos. 21 and 22 form a timber framed wing, and No. 20 was added in about 1840. This is in Gothic style, and has two storeys, two bays and casement windows with arched heads.	II
3 St Alkmond's Square; 52.70771°N 2.75178°W	—	Early 16th century	The house was refronted in the 18th century. It is timber framed with a brick front and a tile roof. There are two storeys and an attic, and one bay. To the left is a round-arched entrance, and the windows are sashes. To the right is a gable with bargeboards and a pendant finial. There is exposed timber framing in the right gable end.	II
Council House Gatehouse and Gateway House; 52.70989°N 2.75033°W		Early 16th century (probable)	The house is the earlier part, with the gatehouse dated 1620. They are timber framed with brick infill and tile roofs, and there is a lean-to porch. The gateway has Corinthian columns. Some windows are casements, some are mullioned and transomed, beside the gateway is a Gothic-style window, and there are two gabled dormers. The tie-beam and bargeboards have vine-scroll decoration.	I
2A Council House Courtyard; 52.70967°N 2.75010°W	—	16th century	The house was altered in the 18th century. It is timber framed and refronted in brick, and partly rendered, with a moulded eaves cornice and a Welsh slate roof with coped gables. There are two storeys and three bays, and the windows are sashes.	II
11 Fish Street; 52.70784°N 2.75294°W		16th century	A house on a corner site, later used for other purposes, it is timber framed with a tile roof. There are two storeys, two bays, and a rear wing with a jettied upper storey. In the centre is a doorway with a canopy hood flanked by small-pane shop windows. The upper floor contains horizontally-sliding sash windows.	II
1 High Street; 52.70707°N 2.75248°W		16th century	The oldest part is the rear wing, which has a timber framed upper storey and a tile roof. The main part dates from the late 19th century, and is on a corner site. This is in stuccoed brick with a plain cornice and parapet eaves. There are three storeys, four bays on High Street, three on Fish Street, and one on the rounded corner between. In the ground floor is a shop front, and above are sash windows and two dormers. The rear wing has two storeys and an attic, the upper storey is jettied with a moulded bressumer, and the windows are casements.	II
Premises occupied by Aspinall's; 52.70753°N 2.75492°W	—	16th century	Offices that were refronted in the 19th century and altered in the 20th century, the building is in brick with a dentilled eaves cornice and a tile roof. There are two storeys and three bays. Steps lead up to the doorway, the windows are sashes, and there are three dormers.	II
Clive House and adjacent dwelling 52.70640°N 2.75449°W	—	16th century	The house was refaced in 1752. It is timber framed with encasing and extensions in brick, and tile roofs. It has a dentilled eaves cornice and coped gables. The main block has two storeys and attics, and six bays, and there is a rear wing with two storeys and three bays that forms a separate residence. There are two similar doorways, one in the centre and the other on the side. Each doorway has an architrave, rusticated pilasters, and a modillioned pediment. The windows are sashes, and there are six gabled dormers.	II*
Premises occupied by The Good Life; 52.70631°N 2.75172°W	—	16th century	A pair of houses, refronted in the 18th century, and later used for other purposes. They are in brick with a timber framed core, a dentilled eaves band, and a tile roof. There are two storeys and an attic, and five bays. In the ground floor are doorways and small shop windows, most of the windows above are sashes, and there are hipped gabled attic dormers.	II
The Lion and Pheasant Hotel; 52.70617°N 2.74895°W		16th century (probable)	The hotel was refronted in the early 18th century. It has a timber framed core, it is partly encased in roughcast brick, and has a tile roof. There are two storeys and attics, a front of six bays, and a rear wing. In the ground floor is a shopfront to the right, three windows, and at the left is a segmental archway. The windows on the front are sashes, and there are three attic dormers. The rear wing is entirely timber framed, and contains casement windows.	II
The Old Tudor Steak House; 52.70841°N 2.75306°W		Mid-16th century	Originally houses on a corner site, later used for other purposes, the building is timber framed with a tile roof. There are three storeys, the upper storeys jettied, five bays on Butcher Row, and a gable end on Pride Hill containing a shop front. In the middle floor are five rectangular bay windows containing mullioned and transomed windows, and in the top floor are casement windows. The bressumers are moulded, and the plasterwork is decorated with Tudor roses and fleur-de-lys.	II*
Drapers' Hall, raised pavement and railings 52.70825°N 2.75149°W		1560	Originally the guildhall of the Drapers' Guild, later used for other purposes, it is timber framed with a tile roof, three storeys and two bays. In the right bay is a four-centred arch, the upper storeys are jettied, in the middle floor is an oriel window containing a mullioned and transomed window, and in the top floor is another mullioned and transomed window. The left bay contains two sash windows in the ground floor, over which is the moulded bressumer of the slightly jettied upper floor which contains a six-light mullioned and transomed window. The gable above has decorative bargeboards and a finial. In front of the hall is a raised pavement and a wall with railings.	II*
Owen's Mansion; 52.70803°N 2.75397°W		1569	A house, later a shop, it is timber framed with a tile roof, three storeys, the top storey jettied, and two bays. The ground floor contains an inserted shop front. In the middle floor are two mullioned and transomed oriel windows, between which is an inscribed plaque. Over these is a moulded bressumer. The top floor contains two three-light oriel windows, above which are projecting gables with decorative bargeboards and figures as finials.	II*
5 and 5A The Square; 52.70766°N 2.75445°W	—	c. 1572	A house, later two shops, it is timber framed with a tile roof, three storeys and three bays. In the ground floor are shop fronts. The upper storeys are both jettied with moulded bressumers, and each floor contains three oriel windows with mullioned and transomed windows. Above the top windows are gables with decorative bargeboards.	II
15 and 16 High Street; 52.70766°N 2.75343°W		1575	At one time an inn, later used for other purposes, the building is on a corner site. It is timber framed with a tile roof, two storeys and an attic, and a front of two bays facing High Street, the right bay projecting. In the ground floor is a late 20th-century shop front, and the upper storey is jettied with a moulded bressumer. Both bays contain an oriel window with a gable above. In the left return facing Grope Lane is a five-light mullioned and transomed window, and above in the attic gable is a casement window. Beyond this range are two lower bays with a jettied upper storey containing mullioned and transomed windows. and a loading door and a hoist in a gabled dormer.	II*
Ireland's Mansion; 52.70800°N 2.75427°W		c.1575	A house, later shops and offices, it is timber framed with a tile roof, three storeys with attics, and four bays. In the ground floor are shop fronts, and between them are doorways with moulded architraves leading to passages. Above, the outer bays contain two-storey semi-octagonal canted bay windows, the second and fourth bays have two-storey square bay windows, and in the middle bay is an oriel window. The top storey is jettied, and above each bay is a gable with a carved bressumer, bargeboards and finials.	II*
17 High Street; 52.70773°N 2.75350°W		Late 16th century	A house, later a shop, it is timber framed with a tile roof, three storeys, two bays, and a lower rear wing. In the ground floor is a projecting shop front, and above are inserted windows. In the rear wing is a moulded bressumer, and across the rear gable is an enriched bressumer.	II*
22 High Street; 52.70795°N 2.75385°W		Late 16th century	A house, later used for other purposes, it is timber framed and has a Welsh slate roof. There are two storeys and attics, and two bays. In the ground floor is a shop front, and the upper floor contains mullioned and transomed windows. Above these is decorative balustrading, and mullioned and transomed windows in the attic, which is gabled with decorative bargeboards and finials carved as figures.	II*
17 and 18 Princess Street; 52.70671°N 2.75297°W	—	Late 16th century	A pair of shops, probably originally a single house that has been altered. It is in brick with some remaining timber framed core, and it has a tile roof. There are three storeys and two bays under a gable. In the ground floor are shop fronts, and the upper floors contain sash windows with stuccoed heads.	II
27 Wyle Cop; 52.70627°N 2.74997°W		Late 16th century	A house, later a shop, it is timber framed and has a tile roof. There are three storeys and an attic, and two bays. In the ground floor is a shop front and a side door to the right, the upper floors contain sash windows, and there are two tall gabled dormers with moulded bargeboards.	II
28, 29 and 30 Wyle Cop; 52.70624°N 2.74984°W		Late 16th century	At one time a hotel, it was extensively restored in 1890, and has been converted for other uses. The building is timber framed with a tile roof, the left part has two storeys and an attic, the right part has three storeys, and between them is an archway with flanking rear wings. The left part has shop windows in the ground floor, the upper floor is jettied, and contains two oriel windows, and the attic has two gables with bargeboards and pendant finials, and contains casement windows. The ground floor of the right part is in brick with stone dressings, and contains a doorway and two windows. The middle storey contains an oriel window and a mullioned and transomed, and the jettied top floor also has mullioned and transomed windows.	II
69A and 70 Wyle Cop; 52.70630°N 2.75093°W	—	Late 16th century	A house, later a pair of shops, timber framed with tile roofs. The building consists of a hall and a gabled cross-wing to the left, both with shop fronts in the ground floor, and a passage between them. The hall range has two storeys and an attic, exposed timber framing, a mullioned window in the upper floor, and a gabled roof dormer. The projecting cross-wing is plastered and painted to resemble timber framing, in the upper floor is an oriel window, and the gable has decorated bargeboards and a finial.	II
85 and 86 Wyle Cop; 52.70688°N 2.75221°W		Late 16th century	A house on a corner site, later altered, and converted into a shop. It is timber framed with brick infill and has a tile roof. There are two storeys and an attic, two bays on Wyle Cop, and a gabled bay on Milk Street. In the ground floor is a late 19th-century shop front with traceried glazing and a continuous fascia. In the upper floor are oriel windows, there is a smaller oriel window in the gable in Milk Street, and facing Wyle Cop are two gabled eaves dormers with elaborate fretted bargeboards.	II
Castle Gates House; 52.71021°N 2.75020°W		Late 16th century	The house was moved to its present site in about 1702 and has been altered and extended since. It is timber framed with a tile roof. There are two storeys and an attic, a main range of three bays, a two-storey extension on the left and a long right rear wing. On the front are three two-storey canted bay windows, and a moulded bressumer above the ground floor. The doorway in the middle bay has a four-centred arched doorway, and the windows are mullioned and transomed.	II*
Cromwell's Hotel; 52.70747°N 2.75125°W		Late 16th century (probable)	The hotel is timber framed and rendered with a tile roof. There are two storeys and attics, and six bays, with a gable above the left two bays. The doorway has a fanlight, the windows are sashes, and there are two gabled dormers. All the gables have bargeboards and finials.	II
Perches House; 52.70930°N 2.75136°W		Late 16th century	A timber framed house with a brick plinth and a tile roof. There are three storeys and seven bays. Between the storeys are moulded bressumers, and the top storey is jettied. The windows are a mix of casements and sashes, and there are roof dormers.	II*
St Mary's Cottage; 52.70890°N 2.75161°W		Late 16th century	At one time a vicarage, the building is timber framed with a brick basement and a tile roof. There are two storeys and an attic, and two bays. In the ground floor, steps lead up to doorways, one of which is blocked, and the floor contains an oriel window, over which is a continuous hood on curved brackets. In the upper floor are continuous casement windows, and there are also casement windows in the gabled dormers.	II
The Golden Cross Public House; 52.70678°N 2.75313°W		Late 16th century	The public house is timber framed with some brick infill, and it has a tile roof. There are two storeys and an attic, a front of three bays, and a long rear extension. On the front is a doorway with a four-centred arched head at the left, a canted bay window in the middle, and a passage entry to the right. The upper storey is jettied with a moulded bressumer, and in the top floor and gable are casement windows. The rear wing has some lath and plaster infill, it has a continuous jetty, and there has been some renewal in brick.	II*
The Old School House; 52.70613°N 2.75069°W	—	Late 16th century	The house was altered and refaced in the 18th century. It is timber framed with a front in brick, and has two storeys and an attic, and two bays. The windows are casements with cambered heads, and the doorway has a fanlight and a canopy on moulded brackets.	II
Veterinary surgery and garage 52.70678°N 2.75457°W	—	Late 16th century (probable)	A pair of houses later used for other purposes. The older is the house on the left, it is timber framed with brick infill in the ground floor, a tile roof, two storeys, two bays, and mullioned windows. The house to the right is in brick with a tile roof, two storeys and an attic, two bays, and a lower bay to the right, and it contains sash windows.	II
Windsor Lodge; 52.70922°N 2.75131°W	—	1581	Also known as Peche's Mansion, it is timber framed house with a tile roof and two storeys. The house consists of a hall and cross-wings, the hall range refaced in brick in the 18th century. The doorway has a moulded architrave, and the windows are sashes. One of the beams is inscribed with the date, initials, and a coat of arms.	II*
Old Market Hall; 52.70741°N 2.75446°W		1595–96	The market hall, which has been converted for other uses, is in Grinshill sandstone and has a tile roof. There is a cruciform plan, two storeys, and seven bays. The ground floor is open with Tuscan columns and semicircular arches. In the upper floor are windows with three or four lights and transoms, and the parapet has reversed volutes. The building contains a plaque with the names of the bailiffs when it was constructed, and a statue of the Black Prince.	I
Forecourt, wall and railings, 7 Belmont; 52.70594°N 2.75358°W	—	Late 16th or early 17th century	The forecourt has stone flagging and the boundary wall is in brick. The gate piers are in stone, and each has recessed panels, a moulded cap and a ball finial.	II
11 College Hill; 52.70681°N 2.75532°W	—	Late 16th or early 17th century	A timber framed house that was refronted in brick in the late 18th century. It has a tile roof, three storeys, three bays, and a lower rear wing. The doorway has a reeded architrave and an entablature with moulded consoles. The windows are sashes, and there is exposed timber framing at the rear.	II
8 Milk Street; 52.70668°N 2.75272°W	—	Late 16th or early 17th century	A house, later a shop, to which the front was added in the 18th century. It is in brick over timber framing with a moulded eaves cornice and a Welsh slate roof. There are two storeys and an attic, and six bays. In the ground floor, to the left is a bow window, and to the right are shop fronts. The upper floor contains sash windows and one blind window, and there is a gabled dormer.	II
6, 7 and 8 Wyle Cop; 52.70686°N 2.75149°W	—	16th or 17th century	A row of three shops dating mainly from the 18th century. They have a timber framed core, and are in brick with parapet eaves. There are three storeys and three bays. In the ground floor are 20th-century shop fronts, and the upper floors contain paired sash windows with segmentally-arched stuccoed heads and keystones. In the parapet are brick aprons. The window in the middle floor of No. 8 extends lower and there is a wrought iron balcony, and above the top window is an inserted window cutting into the apron.	II
19 Wyle Cop; 52.70642°N 2.75067°W	—	16th or 17th century	A shop with a timber framed core, refronted in brick in the late 18th century and painted, with parapet eaves and a tile roof. There are three storeys and three bays. In the ground floor is a 20th-century shop front, the upper floors contain sash windows, and there is exposed timber framing in the rear gable.	II
Prince Rupert Hotel; 52.70803°N 2.75198°W		Late 16th or early 17th century	A house, later altered and converted into a hotel, it is timber framed with the ground floor rebuilt in brick, and it has a tile roof. There are two storeys with attics, and four bays, the left bay mainly stuccoed. The upper floor is jettied with moulded bressumers, and the outer bays are gabled. The windows are casements, and in the middle two bays are gabled dormers.	II*
4 Belmont; 52.70616°N 2.75303°W		1602–03	A house later used for other purposes, it is timber framed and was refronted in brick in about 1753. There are three storeys, and the front on Belmont has seven bays, the middle three bays pedimented. The central doorway has a rusticated architrave, side lights and a pediment. The windows are sashes with triple keystones. The left return has exposed timber framing, the upper floor and gable are jettied with bressumers, the upper one with carved decoration, and the windows are inserted casements.	II
12A College Hill; 52.70667°N 2.75539°W	—	Early 17th century	A timber framed house with a tile roof. There are two storeys, three bays, and a narrow brick bay to the right. The windows are casements.	II
15 St Mary's Street; 52.70790°N 2.75165°W		Early 17th century	A house, later a restaurant, that was refronted in the early 20th century. It is basically timber framed and is faced in brick, with a tile roof and the gable facing the street. There are three storeys, a shop front in the ground floor, above which is a two-storey oriel window containing mullioned and transomed windows, quatrefoil panels, and an embattled parapet. The gable has bargeboards and a pendant finial. To the left is a flat-roofed extension with a doorway on the front and two gabled dormers on the side.	II
Three cottages to rear of 58 and 59 Wyle Cop; 52.70587°N 2.74958°W	—	Early 17th century	A row of three timber framed cottages, later used for other purposes. They have brick infill, a tile roof, and one storey. The doors and windows, some of which are blocked, have segmental-arched heads, and there are attic dormers.	II
The Old Mansion; 52.70817°N 2.75213°W	—	Early 17th century	A timber framed house that was faced in brick in the late 17th or early 18th century. It has a tile roof, three storeys, and three gabled bays. In the centre is a latticed porch with a hood. The windows in the lower floors are sashes, and in the attic they are casements.	II*
The Old Porch House; 52.70655°N 2.75639°W		1628	A timber framed house with a tile roof, two storeys, three gabled bays, and a long rear wing. In the centre is a full-height gabled porch, probably inserted, with a hood on heavy carved brackets. The upper storey is slightly jettied, the windows on the front are mullioned and transomed, those in the upper floor projecting on brackets, and in the gable end is a sash window.	II*
12 Dogpole; 52.70759°N 2.75135°W		17th century (possible)	Although it has an earlier core, all the visible fabric dates from the 20th century. The ground floor is in brick and above is applied timber framing. There are two storeys and two bays. In the ground floor is a central doorway with a four-centred arched head and a canopy, which is flanked by shop windows. In the upper floor are oriel windows, and above are tall gabled dormers with mullioned windows.	II
5 and 6 Milk Street; 52.70655°N 2.75267°W	—	17th century (possible)	A house, later a shop, with a front added in the 19th century. It is timber framed with a painted brick front, a parapet, and a tile roof. There are two storeys and five bays. In the ground floor is a shop front with a central door, and another doorway to the left. The upper floors contain sash windows, with blind windows in the middle bay.	II
4 Swan Hill; 52.70659°N 2.75612°W	—	17th century (probable)	A pair of houses, later one house, refronted in the late 18th century. There is a timber framed core, refronted in brick, with an eaves cornice to the parapet, and a tile roof. There are two storeys and four bays. Each doorway has a moulded architrave and an entablature on console brackets. In the ground floor are two casement windows with segmental heads, one with three lights, and the other with two. The upper floor contains three sash windows and one blind window.	II
Dogpole House; 52.70771°N 2.75145°W	—	17th century or earlier	The house dates mainly from the 19th century and has an earlier core. It is in brick with a tile roof, and the front facing a passageway. There are two storeys and two bays. The central doorway has a reeded architrave and an open pediment, the windows are sashes, and there is a gabled dormer.	II
Granville House; 52.70617°N 2.75286°W	—	17th century	The house was refronted in the 18th century. It is in brick on a stone plinth with a timber framed core, and has a tile roof. There are two storeys and an attic, and five bays. It has three inserted doorways, the windows are casements, some with segmental heads, and there are three attic dormers.	II
Old Post Office Public House; 52.70656°N 2.75202°W		17th century	The public house was extended in the 19th century. The early part is timber framed, and the later part is in brick, some of it painted to resemble timber framing. It has a tile roof, three storeys and a T-shaped plan. The windows are casements. In the angle is a porch with a hipped roof, and above it are sash windows and an oriel window.	II
8 Belmont; 52.70581°N 2.75366°W	—	Late 17th century	A brick house that has a tile roof with a coped pedimented gable. There are two storeys, three bays, a narrow 18th-century bay on the left, and a 19th-century wing at right angles on the right. On the front is a timberwork porch, and the windows are sashes, some with astragals. At the rear is a pedimented gable surmounted by urns.	II
14 College Hill; 52.70677°N 2.75448°W	—	Late 17th century	A house with a timber framed core enclosed in brick in the 19th century, and with a dentilled eaves band, two storeys and a tile roof. The right part has one bay, a doorway with a small canopy hood, and a sash window. The left part has two bays and two gabled dormers.	II
23 and 23A Princess Street; 52.70687°N 2.75360°W		Late 17th century	A house, later a shop, on a corner site, in painted brick with some timber framing, an overhanging moulded eaves cornice, and a hipped tile gambrel roof. There are three storeys and attics, four bays on Princess Street, and three on College Hill. In the ground floor are shop fronts, the windows in the upper floors on College Hill are sashes, on Princess Street they are casements with transoms, and there are two hip-roofed dormers. There is exposed timber framing in the gable end, and some internally.	II
24 and 25 Princess Street; 52.70695°N 2.75387°W	—	Late 17th century (probable)	A house, subsequently used for other purposes, it has a later front in brick, with a parapet and a tile roof. There are two storeys and wide gabled attics, and four bays. The ground floor contains a recessed shop front, and in the upper floor are sash windows with cambered heads.	II
17 St Mary's Street; 52.70803°N 2.75179°W		Late 17th century	A house, later a shop, on a corner site, in painted brick with stone dressings, angle quoins, a dentilled string course, and a tile roof with the coped gable facing the street. There are two storeys and an attic. In the ground floor is a late 19th-century shop front containing a central doorway with a continuous fascia on cast iron columns. In the upper floor is a casement window, and the gable contains a sash window flanked by niches with segmental arches and hood moulds. In the Church Street front is a doorway, a mullioned and transomed window, and a gabled dormer.	II
20 and 21 Wyle Cop; 52.70643°N 2.75071°W		Late 17th century (possible)	A pair of shops that were refronted in brick in the late 18th century. They have parapet eaves, four storeys and five bays. In the ground floor are 20th-century shop fronts, No. 21 has curved windows, and to the right is a passageway. The upper floors contain sash windows, and there is one blind window.	II
Belmont House; 52.70585°N 2.75352°W		Late 17th century	A brick house with string courses, a deep modillion eaves cornice, and a hipped tile roof. There are two storeys and an attic, and five bays. The doorway has a fanlight with interlaced tracery and a pediment. The windows are sashes and there are two pedimented gabled attic dormers.	II*
1 and 2 Council House Courtyard; 52.70952°N 2.75004°W		c. 1700	A pair of houses incorporating earlier material. They are in brick with angle quoins, a parapet and a Welsh slate roof. There are three storeys, and entrance front of six bays, and eleven bays at the rear. The doorway to No. 1 has an architrave with fluted Corinthian pilasters and a pediment, and the doorway to No. 2 has a moulded architrave, a fanlight, and a canopy on console brackets. The windows are sashes with moulded sills.	II*
8 and 9 Dogpole; 52.70722°N 2.75118°W		c. 1700	A shop and a house with tile roofs. Facing the street is a shop in stuccoed brick with a string course. In the ground floor is a shop front, and above are sash windows and a dormer. At the rear is a parallel range in brick with two storeys and an attic, sash windows, and string courses.	II
6 St Alkmond's Place; 52.70792°N 2.75220°W		c. 1700	A house, later an office, in painted brick with a coved eaves cornice, and a hipped tile roof. There are two storeys and an attic, and four bays. The doorway has a fanlight, and a high segmental pediment with a moulded entablature. The windows are sashes, the window above the doorway being blind. On the roof are two hipped gabled dormers and a belvedere with a hipped roof.	II
9 St Mary's Place; 52.70828°N 2.75139°W		c. 1700	A brick house, later an office, with a string course, a decorative cornice, and a slate roof with coped gables. There are two storeys and an attic, and four bays. The doorway has a fanlight and a high pediment, the windows are sashes, and there are two roof dormers.	II
Apothecaries House; 52.70669°N 2.75540°W	—	c. 1700	The house incorporates earlier timber framing, and was restored in the 20th century. It is in brick, partly rendered, and has a hipped tile roof. There are two storeys and an attic, and three bays. The doorway has Ionic columns, in the ground floor are French windows, the upper floor contains sash windows, and in the attic are casement windows.	II
The Guildhall; 52.70757°N 2.75092°W		c. 1700	The house, (also known as Newport House), is in brick with stone dressings, angle quoins, a sill band, a deep modillion eaves band, and an overhanging hipped Welsh slate roof. There are two storeys and attics, and a square plan with fronts of five bays. In the centre is an early 19th-century porch that has paired fluted Doric columns and a triglyph frieze, and the doorway has a moulded and decorative architrave. The windows are sashes, and there are roof dormers, one with a segmental pediment, and the others with triangular pediments.	II*
3 Milk Street; 52.70666°N 2.75251°W	—	Late 17th or early 18th century	A house, later used for other purposes, it probably incorporates earlier material. It is in painted brick with a string course, a moulded eaves cornice, and a tile roof. There are two storeys and four bays. In the ground floor is a shop front, and the upper floors contain mullioned and transomed windows.	II
79 and 80 Wyle Cop; 52.70678°N 2.75173°W	—	Late 17th or early 18th century	A pair of timber framed shops, rendered at the front, with a projecting eaves cornice, and a tile roof. There are three storeys and an attic, and each shop has one bay. In the ground floor are shop fronts, the front of No. 79 has a fascia on ornate console brackets. The top floor is jettied with a moulded bressumer, the windows are sashes, and No. 79 has a gabled dormer.	II
The Coach and Horses Public House; 52.70675°N 2.75606°W		Late 17th or early 18th century	The public house, probably originally two houses, was extended to the right in the later 18th century. It is timber framed and encased in rendered brick, and has dentilled eaves and a tile roof. There are two storeys and attics, the older part facing Cross Hill has two bays, a doorway with a sash window to the right and casement windows elsewhere, and two attic dormers. The later part has four bays, the left bay curving round the corner, and the others facing Swan Hill. This part contains a doorway and sash windows.	II
25 High Street; 52.70808°N 2.75407°W	—	1709	The shop has an earlier core, and is in brick over timber framing. It has quoins, a string course, an overhanging moulded modillion eaves cornice, and a tile roof. There are three storeys and an attic, and three bays. In the ground floor is a shop front, in the upper floors are sash windows with moulded sills and recessed aprons, one of which contains a dated plaque, and at the top are two pedimented gabled dormers. Inside is exposed timber framing.	II*
18 and 19 High Street; 52.70779°N 2.75358°W		1713	A house, later a shop, in painted brick, with a string course, angle quoins, an overhanging moulded modillion eaves cornice, and a tile roof with coped gables. There are three storeys and four bays. In the ground floor is a shop front, the upper floors contain sash windows, those in the top floor with moulded sills and recessed aprons, and there are two hipped dormers.	II
13 The Square; 52.70719°N 2.75454°W	—	1713	A shop incorporating an earlier timber framed structure. It is in painted brick with angle quoins, sill bands, an overhanging modillion eaves cornice, and a tile roof. There are three storeys and an attic, and four bays. In the ground floor is an early 20th-century shop front with a three-light shop window, a doorway on the left, and a passage door on the right, over which is a fascia on plain consoles. The windows are sashes with moulded sills, and there are two pedimented dormers.	II
14 and 14A The Square; 52.70717°N 2.75444°W	—	1713	A shop that was later extended to the rear, it is in rendered brick with quoins, parapet eaves and a tile roof. There are four storeys and two bays. In the ground floor is a shop front, and the upper floors contain casement windows with transoms in moulded architraves.	II
16 and 17 Butcher Row; 52.70820°N 2.75300°W		1715	A shop later used for other purposes, it is in painted brick with quoins, moulded modillion eaves, and an overhanging tile roof. There are three storeys and an attic, and four bays. In the ground floor is a shop front, the upper floors contain mullioned and transomed windows and a datestone, and there are two attic dormers.	II
61–64 Wyle Cop; 52.70620°N 2.75023°W	—	c. 1720	A terrace of four houses, later shops, in brick with stone dressings, angle quoins, a projecting modillion eaves cornice, and a tile roof with coped gables. There are two storeys with attics, and nine bays. In the ground floor are shop fronts, the top floor contains sash windows, and there are four dormers with hipped roofs.	II
Former Bowdler's School; 52.70597°N 2.75105°W		1724	The school, later an office, is in brick with stone dressings, quoins, a string course, a projecting modillion eaves band, and a hipped tile roof. There are two storeys and attics, and five bays, the outer bays slightly projecting. The central doorway has a shouldered architrave and a segmental pediment over which is an inscribed datestone. The windows are casements with transoms, moulded sills, and segmentally-arched heads with keystones, and there are two gabled dormers.	II
Forecourt, railings and gates, 6 Belmont; 52.70599°N 2.75346°W	—	Early 18th century	The forecourt is paved in stone, and there are wrought iron railings and gates. There is a pair of stone gate piers, each with recessed panels and a moulded cap.	II
10 Belmont; 52.70564°N 2.75403°W		Early 18th century	A brick house with string courses, a modillion eaves cornice, and a tile roof with coped gables. There are two storeys and an attic, and seven bays. The central doorway has a fanlight, the windows are sashes, some of them blind, and there are three gabled dormers.	II*
Wall, gate piers and forecourt, 10 Belmont; 52.70570°N 2.75411°W	—	Early 18th century	In front of the house is a paved forecourt. The boundary wall and the gate piers are in brick.	II
16 Belmont; 52.70534°N 2.75508°W	—	Early 18th century	The house, which faces away from the road, is in brick with a roof partly of tile and partly of Welsh slate. There are two storeys, three bays, and two rear wings with a courtyard between. On the front are two full-height canted bay windows, that on the right with a further single-storey bay window with an embattled parapet.	II
22 Butcher Row; 52.70831°N 2.75314°W		Early 18th century	A house, later a shop, in painted brick with a string course and a tile roof. There are two storeys and an attic, and two bays. In the ground floor is a 20th-century shop front, the upper floor contains two sash windows with segmental heads and a continuous sill, and there is a gabled attic dormer.	II
3 College Hill; 52.70663°N 2.75421°W	—	Early 18th century	A house, later an office, it was refronted in the 20th century. The building is in stuccoed brick and has a tile roof, two storeys and an attic, and three bays. The central doorway has a moulded architrave, a fanlight, and an entablature on console brackets. This is flanked by sash windows, in the upper floor are two shallow oriel windows and a small inserted window, and there are two gabled dormers.	II
13 College Hill; 52.70684°N 2.75552°W		Early 18th century	A brick house on a corner site with a hipped tile roof, sash windows, and gabled dormers. The main block is stuccoed, with quoins, and has two storeys and a basement and three bays. Steps lead up to a central doorway that has an Ionic doorcase. To the right is a wing with three storeys and a basement, one bay on College Hill and four on Swan Hill, a moulded modillion eaves cornice, a string course, and two plain doorways.	II
21 and 21A Dogpole; 52.70702°N 2.75102°W	—	Early 18th century	A pair of brick houses with Welsh slate roofs and a 19th-century front. No. 21 to the left has two storeys and five bays, the middle bay higher, a stuccoed cornice, and an eaves parapet. To the left is a garage entry, and to the right is a doorway that has an architrave with Corinthian pilasters and a pediment. The windows are sashes, and in the middle bay is a cast iron balcony. No. 21A has two storeys and an attic and three bays. There is a modillion eaves cornice, the windows are sashes with stuccoed heads and voussoirs, and there are three dormers with segmental heads.	II
5 and 6 Fish Street; 52.70761°N 2.75279°W		Early 18th century	A house, later a pair of shops, possibly incorporating earlier material, they are in brick and have a tile roof with crow-stepped gables. There are two storeys and attics, each shop has two bays. In the ground floor are shop fronts, the upper floor contains casement windows, and there are two gabled attic dormers.	II
7 and 8 Fish Street; 52.70770°N 2.75287°W	—	Early 18th century	A house, later used for other purposes, incorporating earlier material. It is in brick, possibly on a timber framed core, with a dentilled eaves cornice, and a tile roof. There are two storeys and an attic, and two bays. In the ground floor is a shop front, the upper floor contains casement windows, and there are two gabled dormers.	II
2 and 2A Golden Cross Passage; 52.70683°N 2.75294°W	—	Early 18th century	A house and a workshop, later a shop, it is in brick with a tile roof. There are two storeys, two bays, and a single-storey extension. The windows are casements, and there is an inserted shop front.	II
12 and 13 High Street; 52.70752°N 2.75327°W	—	Early 18th century	A pair of brick shops with quoins, and an overhanging moulded modillion eaves cornice. There are three storeys and attics, and each shop has three bays. In the ground floor are shop fronts, the upper floors contain sash windows with arched heads and keystones, and there are four dormers, three with segmental pediments and one with a triangular pediment.	II
14 High Street; 52.70760°N 2.75336°W		Early 18th century	A shop that was refronted in the 19th century, it is in brick with angle quoins and a decorative parapet. There are three storeys and two bays. In the ground floor are rusticated piers flanking a shop front that has curving windows with copper shafts, over which is a fascia forming a segmental pediment over the centre. In the upper floors, the windows have three lights with round heads in round-arched moulded architraves, over which are flat entablatures.	II
6 Market Street; 52.70740°N 2.75510°W	—	Early 18th century	A house, later used for other purposes, it is in brick with parapet eaves and a tile roof. There are three storeys and three bays. In the ground floor is a shop front, and the upper floors contain sash windows and some blind windows.	II
9 and 10 Milk Street; 52.70680°N 2.75258°W	—	Early 18th century (possible)	A house, later a shop, it is in stuccoed brick with a string course, an eaves band, and a Welsh slate roof. There are three storeys and three bays. In the ground floor is a shop front with three canted bay windows and three doorways, and the upper floors contain sash windows.	II
20 Princess Street and 7 Milk Street; 52.70662°N 2.75282°W		Early 18th century	A house, later a shop, on a corner site, it is in brick, the ground floor is in channelled stucco, and it has a string course, a modillion eaves band, and a tile roof, hipped on one side and with a coped gable. There are three storeys and attics, five bays on Princess Street and four on Milk Street. In the ground floor is a shop front with a doorway recessed across the angle. The windows are sashes, and there are five pedimented dormers.	II
28 and 29 Princess Street; 52.70702°N 2.75410°W	—	Early 18th century	A shop in painted brick with parapet eaves and a tile roof. There are three storeys and five bays. In the ground floor are shop fronts and a doorway with a fanlight, the upper floors contain sash windows, and there are three gabled dormers.	II
1 Swan Hill; 52.70681°N 2.75568°W	—	Early 18th century	A brick house with a projecting string course, a projecting modillion eaves cornice, and a tile roof. There are three storeys with attics, and four bays. The doorway has a moulded surround, a traceried fanlight, and a canopy on console brackets. The windows are sashes with moulded surrounds, and there are two pedimented dormers.	II
2 and 3 Swan Hill; 52.70668°N 2.75592°W		Early 18th century	A pair of brick houses with a projecting moulded eaves cornice, and a tile roof with a coped gable on the left. There are two storeys and an attic, and four bays. The doorway on the front is recessed in a moulded architrave, and has a fanlight with ogee tracery, and a high pediment. The windows are sashes in moulded cases, and there are two attic dormers.	II
23 and 23A Wyle Cop; 52.70637°N 2.75033°W		Early 18th century	A pair of brick shops with a string course, a moulded eaves cornice, a parapet, and a tile roof. There are three storeys and an attic, and four bays. In the ground floor are two 20th-century shop fronts, both with curved glass. In the upper floors are sash windows, one blind window, and two dormers incorporated in the parapet.	II
24 Wyle Cop; 52.70634°N 2.75022°W	—	Early 18th century	A brick shop with quoins, sill bands, a cornice, and a Welsh slate roof. There are three storeys and two bays. In the ground floor is a late 20th-century shop front and a passage door to the right, and the upper floors contain sash windows with keystones.	II
82 Wyle Cop; 52.70681°N 2.75188°W	—	Early 18th century	A house, later a shop, in painted brick with angle quoins, sill bands, a projecting modillion eaves cornice, and a tile roof with coped gables. The ground floor contains a shop front, the upper floors contain sash windows with keystones and moulded sills, under the top floor windows are recessed aprons, above them are raised panels, and there are two pedimented dormers.	II
Boundary wall, Guildhall; 52.70745°N 2.75100°W	—	Early 18th century	Enclosing the garden are low stone walls, and flanking the entrance to the garden are acorn finials on plinths.	II
Summerhouse, Hardwick House; 52.70656°N 2.75725°W	—	Early 18th century	The summer house is in the garden of the house, and is in brick with a bell-shaped tile roof. There are two storeys and an octagonal plan. Flights of steps flank the doorway on each side.	II*
Loggerheads Public House; 52.70799°N 2.75184°W		Early 18th century	A house, later a public house, it is in painted brick, and has a dentilled string course and a tile roof. There are three storeys, three bays, and a single-storey extension to the right. The doorway has a moulded architrave, a fanlight, and a small canopy. This is flanked by windows with architraves, entablatures and hoods, and in the upper floors are sash windows.	II
Garden wall and gates, Swan Hill Court House; 52.70546°N 2.75610°W	—	Early 18th century	The walls are in brick with stone coping and are about 3.5 metres (11 ft) high. At the entrance are cast iron gates flanked by rusticated stone piers.	II
Talbot House; 52.70679°N 2.75690°W	—	Early 18th century (possible)	A rendered house with angle quoins, string courses, and parapet eaves. There are three storeys and three bays. The doorway has a fanlight and an open pediment, and the windows are sashes.	II
The Judge's Lodging; 52.70590°N 2.75336°W		Early 18th century	A brick house with stone dressings, quoins, sill bands, a moulded eaves band, and a panelled parapet. There are three storeys and six bays. The central doorway has a moulded architrave, a moulded pediment, and side lights. The other windows are sashes with keystones. On the garden front are two full-height canted bay windows flanking a doorway with a segmental broken pediment surmounted by an urn.	II*
7 and 8 Market Street and 10 The Square; 52.70735°N 2.75484°W		1728	A house, later a shop, on a corner site, it is in brick with angle quoins, parapet eaves, and a hipped tile roof. There are four storeys, six bays on The Square, and eight on Market Street. In the ground floor on The Square is a shop front with a panelled dado and a fascia on console brackets. On Market Street is a shop front and a doorway that has a reeded architrave with a triglyph frieze and a fanlight.	II
29A and 30 Princess Street; 52.70713°N 2.75435°W		1730	A pair of houses, later shops, in brick with stuccoed dressings, angle quoins, string courses, an overhanging moulded eaves cornice, a high parapet, and a tile roof. There are three storeys and attics, and four bays. In the ground floor is a narrow shop front on the left and a wider one to the right with a fascia on foliate consoles. The windows are sashes with moulded architraves, and segmental heads with stressed keystones, and there are gabled dormers.	II*
7 The Square; 52.70753°N 2.75467°W		c. 1730	A brick shop with angle quoins, string courses at each level, a deep modillion eaves cornice, and a tile roof. There are three storeys with an attic, and four bays. In the ground floor is a late 19th-century shop front with clustered shafts and a central doorway. To the right is another doorway, also with clustered shafts and an ogee arch, and a passage door to the right of this. The windows in the upper floors are sashes with keystones, and there are two gabled roof dormers.	II*
8 and 9 The Square; 52.70744°N 2.75471°W		1730	Originally houses incorporating earlier material, later used for other purposes. The building is in brick with moulded sill bands, a high parapet containing raised panels, a moulded cornice, and a tile roof with a crow-stepped gable at the rear. There are three storeys and five bays. In the ground floor are shop fronts with a fascia on console brackets. The upper floors contain sash windows with keystones, those in the top floor with aprons.	II*
77 and 78 Wyle Cop; 52.70669°N 2.75155°W		c. 1730	A pair of brick shops with angle quoins, a modillion eaves cornice, and a tile roof with coped gables. There are three storeys and an attic, six bays, and rear wings with crow-stepped gables. In the centre of the ground floor is a segmental archway with a keystone, flanked by shop fronts. The upper floors contain one tripartite sash window, and the other windows are sashes with keystones. The window above the archway has a balcony with cast iron rails. Above the right shop are two dormers.	II
22A Belmont; 52.70563°N 2.75452°W	—	1736	A brick house with a projecting stoccoed string course, a dentilled eaves band, and a tile roof with one coped gable. There are two storeys and four bays. The doorway has a plain architrave and panelled rebates, and above it is a datestone. The windows are sashes, and in the right bay is a carriage entry.	II
9–10 Swan Hill; 52.70619°N 2.75654°W		c. 1740	A pair of brick houses, later used for other purposes, with moulded eaves, and roofs partly in Welsh slate and partly tiled with coped gables. There is a double-depth plan, two storeys and attics, and five bays. No. 9 has a porch with a pediment carried on cylindrical shafts, and a doorway with a fanlight, and the doorway to No. 10 has a moulded architrave and a fanlight. The windows are sashes, and there are five pedimented roof dormers.	II
Chest tomb, Old St Chad's Church; 52.70644°N 2.75304°W	—	1746–62	The chest tomb is in the churchyard to the north of the remains of the church, and is to the memory of Jonathon and Elisabeth Scott. It is in stone with three panels, the central panel inscribed. On the top is an urn with low-relief foliage, heraldic emblems, and fluting.	II
2 Butcher Row; 52.70833°N 2.75295°W		Mid-18th century	A pair of brick shops with an eaves band and a tile roof. There are two storeys and attics, and four bays. In the ground floor are shop fronts with bow windows, the upper floor contains sash windows with segmental heads, and there are two gabled attic dormers.	II
3 College Court; 52.70637°N 2.75427°W	—	Mid-18th century	A house to which a storey was added in the 19th century, later part of St Winefride's Convent, it is in brick with parapet eaves and a Welsh slate roof. There are three storeys, three bays, and a gabled right wing. The central doorway has a Gibbs surround and a pediment, there is a similar doorway in the south front, and the windows are sashes with cambered heads.	II
9 and 10 College Hill; 52.70670°N 2.75519°W	—	Mid-18th century	A pair of houses in painted brick with sill bands, projecting modillion eaves, and a hipped Welsh slate roof. There are three storeys and each house has three bays. The houses have paired doorways with a single pediment, the windows are sashes, there are two dormers, one with a triangular pediment, the other with a segmental pediment, and at the rear are two canted bay windows.	II
7–10 Cross Hill; 52.70684°N 2.75708°W	—	Mid-18th century	A row of three houses and an office incorporating some earlier material. The building is in brick with a string course, an overhanging eaves cornice, and a tile roof. There is some timber framing in the gable wall of No. 7. There are two storeys and twelve bays. In the ground floor is a shop front on the left, and two doorways, one with a rectangular fanlight and a hood on consoles, and the other with a round-headed traceried fanlight. The windows are sashes.	II
3, 4 and 5 Market Street; 52.70744°N 2.75531°W	—	Mid-18th century	Three houses, later two shops, in brick with parapet eaves. There are four storeys, and each former house has two bays. In the ground floor are shop fronts, the right front recessed, and between them is a doorway. In the upper floors, most of the windows are sashes with stuccoed heads, and there are some casement windows.	II
19 Princess Street; 52.70665°N 2.75294°W	—	18th century	A house, later a shop, with possibly an earlier core, it is in brick with a tile roof. There are two storeys and an attic, and one bay. In the ground floor is a shop front and a passage door to the left, the upper floor contains a casement window, and there is a gabled roof dormer.	II
11 Swan Hill; 52.70611°N 2.75668°W	—	Mid-18th century	The house which is part of a terrace, and later enlarged, is in brick with parapet eaves, and a tile roof. There are three storeys, three bays, and single-storey extensions. The doorway has a fanlight, and the windows are sashes.	II
12 Swan Hill; 52.70608°N 2.75673°W	—	Mid-18th century	The house which is part of a terrace, and later enlarged, is in brick with parapet eaves, and a tile roof. There are three storeys, three bays, and single-storey extensions. The doorway has a steep pedimented head, and the windows are sashes.	II
13 Swan Hill; 52.70604°N 2.75681°W	—	Mid-18th century	A brick house, part of a terrace, with moulded eaves, and a tile roof. There are three storeys, three bays, and single-storey extensions on the front. The doorway has a steep pedimented head, and the windows are sashes.	II
37, 38 and 39 Wyle Cop; 52.70630°N 2.74898°W		Mid-18th century	A shop and dwellings in brick with a part moulded cornice, parapet eaves, and a tiled mansard roof. There are three storeys and attics, four bays, and an additional bay to the right containing an arched passage entry. To the left in the ground floor is a shop front, the windows are sashes, and there are three dormers with segmental-arched heads.	II
40, 41 and 42 Wyle Cop; 52.70637°N 2.74875°W		18th century (probable)	A row of three shops refaced in about 1920, they are in brick with stone dressings, angle quoins, a string course, a cornice, and a tile roof. There are three storeys and six bays. In the ground floor are shop fronts, and the upper floors contain sash windows, some with keystones, some with architraves, and some with pediments.	II
43 and 44 Wyle Cop; 52.70641°N 2.74862°W		18th century	A pair of shops that were refaced in about 1920. They are in brick with stone dressings, angle quoins, sill bands, a cornice, and a tile roof. There are three storeys and three bays. In the ground floor are rusticated piers flanking a shop front containing recessed doors at right angles. In the upper floors are sash windows with keystones, the central window in the middle floor with a pediment, and the window above with an architrave.	II
Gate piers, Swan Hill Court House; 52.70614°N 2.75591°W	—	Mid-18th century	The gate piers at the entrance to the grounds are in rusticated ashlar stone, and have heavy ball finials.	II
21 Town Walls and wall 52.70516°N 2.75511°W		18th century	The house originated as a gazebo, and was extended to the left in the 19th century. It is in brick with a tile roof, and has two storeys. The original part has quoins, a modillion eaves cornice, two bays, sash windows, and a hipped roof. The extension also has a basement and a pedimented doorway. To the right is a brick garden wall.	II
St Winefride's Convent (part); 52.70639°N 2.75394°W	—	Mid-18th century	A pair of houses, extended in the early 19th century, probably with a timber framed core in one part, and later used as a convent. The building consists of a main range, a cross-range at right angles, and a later range to the north. They are in brick with Welsh slate roofs, each part has a doorway, and most of the windows are sashes.	II
14 and 15 Belmont; 52.70541°N 2.75488°W		c. 1760	A pair of brick houses, the ground floor in rusticated stucco, with a modillion eaves cornice, and a tile roof with coped gables. There are three storeys, five bays, and a lower later bay to the right. The middle bay projects as a two-storey porch, in this bay and to the right are doorways with round-headed fanlights, and there is a doorway with a plain surround to the left. The windows are sashes with architraves, and the window above the central doorway has a pediment on consoles. At the rear are two full-height canted bay windows, a Venetian window, and a Venetian doorway.	II*
Water tank, Clive House; 52.70627°N 2.75481°W	—	1760	The rainwater tank is in the garden of the house, and is in lead. It is dated, and has embossed decoration of shells and a lion rampant, and the initials "EE".	II
Water tank, Drapers' Hall; 52.70804°N 2.75139°W	—	1760	The water tank in the grounds of the hall is in lead. It is dated, and is decorated with the letter "A", cartouches and devices.	II
Swan Hill Court House; 52.70591°N 2.75584°W	—	1761–62	A large house designed by Thomas Farnolls Pritchard in Palladian style. It is in brick with stone dressings, and a tile roof. The main block has three storeys and five bays. Above the middle three bays is a pediment decorated with motifs including coats of arms and swags. The doorway has a cornice on brackets, and the windows are sashes in architraves. Flanking the main block are pavilions with 1½ storeys, and three bays, each middle bay containing a Venetian window with a small pediment.	II*
5 and 5A Belmont; 52.70604°N 2.75327°W		Late 18th century	A pair of houses, later used for other purposes, possibly with an earlier core, they are in brick and have tile roofs with coped gables. The main block has three storeys and six bays, the third bay slightly advanced and containing a doorway with a pedimented hood on console brackets. To the right is a block with two storeys and two bays. There is an inserted doorway to the right, and the windows are sashes.	II
11 Belmont; 52.70552°N 2.75438°W		Late 18th century	A brick house with a stuccoed eaves cornice and a tile roof. There are three storeys and four bays. The doorway has an open pediment, and the windows are sashes.	II
13 Belmont; 52.70544°N 2.75467°W	—	Late 18th century	A brick house with a stuccoed eaves cornice and a tile roof. There are three storeys and a basement, and four bays. Steps with iron railings lead up to the doorway that has an open pediment, and the windows are sashes.	II
22 Belmont; 52.70558°N 2.75470°W	—	Late 18th century	A house, probably originally two houses, in brick with a tile roof, two storeys and five bays. There are two doorways with architraves, and the windows are sashes.	II
3, 4 and 5 Church Street; 52.70788°N 2.75214°W	—	Late 18th century	A pair of brick houses, formerly three, with a dentilled eaves cornice and tile roofs. No. 3 is on a corner site, and has two storeys and an attic, a canted corner, and one bay on each front. The windows are casements, and there is a window around the corner. Nos. 4 and 5 have three storeys and two bays, two doorways, mullioned and transomed windows in the lower two floors, and casement windows in the top floor.	II
5 College Hill; 52.70666°N 2.75450°W		Late 18th century	A brick house with a moulded eaves cornice and a slate roof. There are three storeys and four bays, the left bay projecting. The doorway has a Doric surround and an ornate traceried fanlight, and the windows are sashes.	II
6 College Hill; 52.70667°N 2.75463°W	—	Late 18th century	A brick house with a moulded eaves cornice and a slate roof. There are three storeys and two bays. The doorway on the left has a flat entablature with moulded console brackets, and the windows are sashes.	II
11 Cross Hill; 52.70693°N 2.75700°W	—	Late 18th century	A brick house on a corner site, with dentilled eaves and a tile roof. There are four storeys and a gabled three-bay front, with the left bay curved on the corner. In the centre is a doorway, and the windows are sashes.	II
4 and 5 Dogpole; 52.70706°N 2.75123°W	—	Late 18th century	A pair of shops with possibly an earlier core, they are in brick, and have a roof of tile and Welsh slate with coped gables. There are three storeys and two bays. In the ground floor are shop fronts with a recessed doorway, and at the right is a doorway to the upper floors. Above is a fascia on console brackets. The windows in the middle floor are sashes, and in the top floor they are casements.	II
6 and 7 Dogpole; 52.70715°N 2.75117°W		Late 18th century	A shop with possibly a timber framed core, it is in painted brick with parapet eaves and a roof of Welsh slate and tiles. There are three storeys and a basement, and three bays. In the ground floor is a shop front, to the left is a sash window and under that is a basement casement window. In the upper floors are sash windows.	II
16 and 17 Dogpole; 52.70771°N 2.75121°W		Late 18th century	A pair of brick houses on a stone plinth, with a moulded eaves cornice and a parapet. There are three storeys, No. 16 has two bays and No. 17 has four. The doorways have moulded architraves and lozenge-traceried fanlights, and the windows are sashes with flat stuccoed heads.	II
1, 2 and 3 Gullet Passage; 52.70765°N 2.75491°W	—	Late 18th century	A row of three houses, later shops, in painted brick with a dentilled eaves cornice and a tile roof. There are two storeys and three bays, the left bay gabled. In the ground floor are shop windows, and the upper floor contains two mullioned and transomed windows and a sash window.	II
2 and 3 High Street; 52.70711°N 2.75264°W		Late 18th century	A pair of brick shops with two sill bands, the upper one forming a cornice and plain parapet eaves. There are four storeys and four bays, the front slightly canted in the centre. In the middle is a doorway with Ionic columns and an open pediment flanked by shop fronts. The upper floors contain sash windows.	II
4 and 5 High Street; 52.70715°N 2.75276°W	—	Late 18th century	A pair of brick shops with a cornice band below the top storey and plain parapet eaves. There are four storeys and four bays. In the ground floor is a central doorway flanked by shop fronts, and in the upper floors are sash windows.	II
6 High Street; 52.70722°N 2.75285°W	—	Late 18th century	A brick shop with a moulded cornice below the top storey and a plain eaves parapet. There are four storeys and three bays. In the ground floor is a shop front, and above are sash windows, those in the first floor having hoods for blinds.	II
10 and 11 High Street; 52.70744°N 2.75315°W		Late 18th century	A pair of shops, possibly with an earlier core, remodelled by Thomas Farnolls Pritchard. They are in brick with a string course between the storeys and high parapet eaves. There are three storeys and four bays. In the ground floor is a central doorway flanked by late 19th-century shop fronts with some earlier decorated architrave remaining. The double doorway has ornate moulded woodwork forming a pediment and a frieze. The upper two windows in the right bays are casements, and the others are sash windows.	II
2 Market Street; 52.70749°N 2.75548°W	—	Late 18th century	A house, later a shop, it is in brick with a moulded eaves cornice and a tile roof. There are three storeys and three bays. In the ground floor is a 19th-century shop front that has fluted glazing bars dividing its window into three parts, and to the right is a passageway door. The upper floors contain sash windows.	II
1, 2 and 3 Peacock Passage; 52.70701°N 2.75321°W	—	Late 18th century	Three houses, later a shop, in brick with a dentilled eaves cornice and a tile roof. There are two storeys and an attic, and three bays. In the ground floor are an inserted shop front and doorway, with a blocked door and windows to the right. The upper floor and attic contain casement windows.	II
36 St Julian's Friars; 52.70542°N 2.74976°W		Late 18th century	A house, later a shop, in painted brick with a hipped Welsh slate roof. There are three storeys and one bay. In the ground floor is a shop front, and the upper floors contain sash windows.	II
4–8 St Mary's Place; 52.70835°N 2.75126°W		Late 18th century	A row of five houses, partly used for other purposes, and incorporating earlier material. They are in brick with a stuccoed cornice and parapet eaves. There are three storeys and five bays. The doorways have architraves, panelled rebates, fanlights, and cornices on console brackets. There is an inserted shop front to the right, and the windows are sashes. At the rear are remains of timber framing.	II
5 Swan Hill; 52.70655°N 2.75617°W	—	Late 18th century	The house has an earlier, possibly timber framed, core, and is in brick with a parapet cornice and a tile roof. There are two storeys and four bays. The doorway to the right has a side-light, an architrave, and an entablature on console brackets. To the left is a tripartite sash window with a segmental head, and in the upper floor are four smaller sash windows.	II
17 Swan Hill; 52.70632°N 2.75702°W	—	Late 18th century	A brick house with a tile roof, an L-shaped plan, two storeys, and three bays. The doorway has an architrave, rusticated pilasters, a fanlight, and a projecting entablature. The windows are sashes and there are some blocked windows.	II
2 and 3 Swan Hill Court; 52.70617°N 2.75616°W	—	Late 18th century	A pair of brick houses with a moulded eaves cornice and a slate roof. There are three storeys and each house has three bays, and a central doorway with an architrave, a fanlight, and a cornice on console brackets. The windows are sashes with stuccoed heads.	II
6 The Square; 52.70759°N 2.75459°W	—	Late 18th century	A bank, in channelled stucco on the ground floor and brick above, with a stuccoed eaves cornice and a parapet. There are four storeys and three bays. The ground floor contains pilasters, windows and doorways, and above it is a heavy cornice on paired console brackets. In the first floor are three segmental-arched recesses, and the windows are sashes.	II
31 Town Walls and railings 52.70553°N 2.75673°W	—	Late 18th century	A brick house with a Welsh slate roof, three storeys and a basement, and three bays, the middle bay projecting. The central doorway has Doric pilasters and a segmental fanlight. The windows are sashes, and two of the attic windows are raised as dormers. The basement area is enclosed by cast iron railings with spearhead and urn finials.	II
13 and 14 Wyle Cop; 52.70656°N 2.75107°W	—	Late 18th century	A pair of brick shops with quoins, a sil band, a modillion eaves cornice and an overhanging tile roof. There are three storeys and four bays. In the ground floor are shop fronts and stuccoed rusticated pilasters. The upper floors contain sash windows with moulded sills.	II
17 Wyle Cop; 52.70651°N 2.75083°W	—	Late 18th century	A shop in painted brick with a modillion eaves cornice, and a Welsh slate roof with coped gables. There are two storeys and an attic, and four bays. In the ground floor is a shop front dating from about 1900 with slim cast iron columns and a fascia on moulded consoles. The windows are sashes in moulded architraves, and there are two roof dormers.	II
18 Wyle Cop; 52.70645°N 2.75083°W	—	Late 18th century	A shop in rendered brick with parapet eaves, three storeys and two bays. In the ground floor is a shop front with an early 20th-century fascia, and the upper floors contain sash windows.	II
83 and 83A Wyle Cop; 52.70685°N 2.75197°W	—	Late 18th century	A shop that was substantially rebuilt in the 20th century, it is in brick with angle quoins and parapet eaves. There are three storeys and three bays. In the ground floor is a shop window flanked by recessed doors, and the upper floors contain sash windows and blind windows.	II
Belmont Bank House; 52.70610°N 2.75271°W	—	Late 18th century	A brick house with a string course and a tiled roof that has coped gables with kneelers. There are three storeys and an attic, and three bays. The windows are sashes with moulded sills, some of them are blind, and the entrance is at the rear in the street.	II
Garden walls, Clive House; 52.70637°N 2.75505°W	—	Late 18th century	The garden walls to the northwest of the house are in brick with stone copings. Opposite the entrance to the house is a pineapple finial.	II
Kenneth House and Kenneth Lodge; 52.70664°N 2.75087°W	—	Late 18th century	A pair of houses in painted brick with a Welsh slate roof. The main block has three storeys and two bays. Steps lead up to a central doorway with a latticed porch, and the windows are mullioned and transomed. Projecting on the right is a wing with two storeys and two bays, a bow window in the ground floor and sash windows above.	II
Warehouse, Murivance; 52.70604°N 2.75802°W	—	Late 18th century	The warehouse is in painted brick with a dentilled eaves band and a hipped tile roof. There are three storeys and eight bays. In the centre are double doors flanked by single doors with cambered heads, and above the left door is a loading bay. The windows are mullioned and transomed with segmental heads, and some are blind.	II
Wall, St Julian's Churchyard; 52.70699°N 2.75223°W	—	Late 18th century	The churchyard wall is in red sandstone, it is slightly rusticated with pilasters, a Greek key frieze, and a balustraded parapet in white stone. Over the steps leading up to the church is a wrought iron over-arch.	II
Swan Hill House; 52.70646°N 2.75627°W	—	Late 18th century	A brick house with a moulded eaves cornice and a tile roof. There are two storeys and five bays, with a pediment over the central bay. The doorway has Tuscan pilasters, a traceried fanlight, and an entablature. The windows are sashes, and some windows are blind.	II
Former stable, Swan Hill Court House; 52.70542°N 2.75587°W	—	Late 18th century	The stable, later used as a garage, is in brick with a Welsh slate roof. There is a single storey with a doorway, and an opening in the gable end.	II
Windsor House; 52.70911°N 2.75118°W		Late 18th century	A brick house with a roof of tile and Welsh slate. There is a main range with three storeys and five bays, a parapet with a narrow cornice, and a central Ionic doorway with fluted pilasters. To the left is a later range with one long bay and a curved gable end. The windows are sashes, some with keystones, and some with stuccoed heads. The 18th-century interior has been almost completely retained.	II*
Sycamore House; 52.70594°N 2.75231°W	—	1777–79	The house is in brick with a tile roof and has an L-shaped plan. The older part has three storeys and is canted. The doorway has a traceried fanlight and a canopy on curved console brackets. Above the doorway is a blind window painted to resemble the round-headed traceried window to the right. At the rear is a later two-storey range.	II
1 and 2 St Mary's Court; 52.70802°N 2.75103°W	—	c. 1779–80	A pair of houses, later used for other purposes, they are in brick with a sill band, a moulded eaves cornice, and a parapet. There are three storeys, and each house has four bays. Steps with cast iron hand rails lead up to the doorways that have moulded architraves, fanlights, and entablatures on console brackets, and the windows are sashes.	II
Laura's Tower; 52.71064°N 2.74915°W		c. 1790	The tower is a folly designed by Thomas Telford as a summer house in the castle grounds. It is in red sandstone, with an embattled parapet on corbels, and a conical copper roof. There is one storey on a basement, and an octagonal plan. Leading to the doorway is a double curved stairway, and there is lower doorway between the arms of the stairway. The windows are wide lancets, and above them are arrow slits.	II
1 The Square; 52.70789°N 2.75418°W		1792	A bank on a corner site in ashlar stone. There are three storeys, three bays on The Square, and two on High Street. In the ground floor is an inserted shop front. On the front facing The Square are pilasters supporting a cornice and acroteria. The windows are sashes.	II
22–25 The Crescent and railings 52.70508°N 2.75539°W		1793	A terrace of four brick houses on a shallow curve, with a parapet eaves cornice and a Welsh slate roof. There are three storeys and basements at the front and five at the rear, and each house has two bays. The doorways are in recessed arches, and each has an architrave and a fanlight with ornamental fan-like tracery. The windows are sashes, those in the ground floor with blank segmental arches containing similar fan-like tracery. The basement areas are enclosed by cast iron railings.	II
Churchyard wall, Old St Chad's Church; 52.70618°N 2.75331°W	—	1794	The wall that surrounds the churchyard on three sides is partly in sandstone and partly in red brick, and has a stone plinth and coping. The wall contains piers in stone and in brick, one with a pyramidal cap, a segmental-headed gateway with an iron gate, and a flat-headed gateway.	II
5 Swan Hill Court; 52.70603°N 2.75608°W		1790s	A brick house with a moulded string course and a parapet. There are three storeys and four bays. On the front is a Doric porch with detached columns and an entablature, the doorway has a fanlight, and the windows are sashes. To the right is a 19th-century stable extension with a slate roof, a sash window, and a blocked lunette.	II
Murivance House and Allatt House; 52.70602°N 2.75753°W		1799–1800	A school, later offices, it was designed by John Hiram Haycock in Classical style. It is built in brick faced in Grinshill sandstone, and has a hipped Welsh slate roof. There is a symmetrical composition, with a central block of two storeys and five bays on a plinth, with a sill band, and an eaves parapet with a raised inscribed panel. The block contains two doorways with architraves, fanlights, and flat entablatures, and the windows are sashes. On each side is an arcade of three arches, linking to a pavilion with one storey and two bays. On the right pavilion is a sundial.	II
3 and 4 Butcher Row; 52.70827°N 2.75286°W		1799–1800	A pair of brick shops with sill bands, a moulded eaves cornice, and parapet eaves. There are three storeys and four bays. In the ground floor are shop fronts with bow windows, and the upper floors contain sash windows.	II
12 Belmont and railings 52.70551°N 2.75454°W	—	c. 1800	A brick house with a stuccoed eaves cornice and a tile roof. There are three storeys and four bays. Steps with iron railings lead up to a doorway with a round-headed fanlight and an open pediment, and the windows are sashes.	II
7 College Hill; 52.70671°N 2.75469°W	—	c. 1800	A brick house with a stuccoed cornice, a parapet, and a slate roof. There are three storeys and two bays. The round-headed doorway has a moulded architrave, and the windows are sashes.	II
8B College Hill; 52.70673°N 2.75490°W	—	c. 1800	A warehouse in painted brick with a tile roof, it has three storeys and two bays. In the ground floor are double doors, and a tall doorway with a cambered head to the right, and above are two-light windows, one of which is blind.	II
16 College Hill; 52.70670°N 2.75389°W	—	c. 1800	A house, possibly with an earlier core, it is in brick with a moulded eaves cornice, a parapet, and a hipped tile roof. There are three storeys and three bays. The windows are sashes.	II
17 and 18 College Hill; 52.70673°N 2.75375°W	—	c. 1800	A house, later offices, with possibly an earlier core, it is in brick, with a moulded eaves cornice, a parapet, and a hipped tile roof. There are three storeys, three bays, a doorway on the left, and the windows are sashes.	II
19 College Hill; 52.70679°N 2.75368°W	—	c. 1800	A house, later a shop, in brick, the ground floor stuccoed, with parapet eaves containing stuccoed panels, and a Welsh slate roof. There are three storeys and a basement, and two bays. In the ground floor is a central bow window, a round-headed doorway to the left with stuccoed voussoirs and a traceried fanlight, and to the right is a blind archway with similar features. The upper floors contain sash windows flanked by full-height arched recesses.	II
2 and 3 Cross Hill; 52.70673°N 2.75635°W	—	c. 1800	A pair of houses with a sill band and a parapet eaves cornice. There are three storeys, and each house has three bays. The doorways have moulded architraves, the windows are sashes with flat stuccoed heads, and to the left of the doorway of No. 3 is an inserted 16-pane window.	II
7 and 8 High Street; 52.70730°N 2.75295°W	—	c. 1800	A pair of stuccoed brick shops, with a moulded cornice below the top storey, and high parapet eaves. There are four storeys and six bays. In the ground floor is a round-headed doorway flanked by shop fronts, and a passage entry to the right. The upper floors contain sash windows, some of which are blind, and there is a roof dormer.	II
9 High Street; 52.70738°N 2.75308°W	—	c. 1800	A brick shop with high plain parapet eaves, three storeys and two bays. In the ground floor is a shop front, and in the floors above are sash windows.	II
26 and 27 High Street; 52.70817°N 2.75420°W	—	c. 1800	A pair of buildings, probably houses, later a shop, the building is in brick with stone dressings, a moulded eaves cornice, and a parapet. There are four storeys, No. 26 has two bays, and No. 27 has three bays and angle quoins. In the ground floor is a shop front, and the upper floors contain sash windows. The windows in the first and second floors have flat entablatures on moulded console brackets, and the middle window in the first floor of No. 27 has a round head and a keystone.	II
39 High Street; 52.70733°N 2.75328°W	—	c. 1800	A public house, later part of a restaurant, it is in brick with parapet eaves. There are three storeys and two bays. In the ground floor is a shop front, and the upper floors contain sash windows with stuccoed heads and fluted keystones.	II
11, 12 and 13 Princess Street; 52.70685°N 2.75326°W		c. 1800	A terrace of three brick houses with high parapet eaves and a Welsh slate roof. There are three storeys and seven bays. The ground floor is in channelled stucco with two pilasters. In the left bay is a round-headed passageway, and to the right is a larger segmental-arched passageway. The doorways have fanlights, and the windows are sashes, and some of them are blind.	II
3, 4 and 5 St Alkmond's Place; 52.70802°N 2.75238°W		c. 1800	A row of three houses, later used for other purposes, they are in brick with dentilled eaves bands, and tile roofs. They all have three storeys, the middle house is higher, and there is a total of six bays. In the ground floor are late 20th-century shop fronts, and in the upper floors most of the windows are sashes with some casement windows and some blind windows.	II
1 St Alkmond's Square; 52.70785°N 2.75200°W		c. 1800	A brick house on a corner site, with a dentilled eaves band, and a hipped tile roof. There are three storeys and two bays. The doorway has a moulded architrave and an entablature with console brackets. The windows are sashes with stuccoed heads, and in the left return are blind windows.	II
7 and 8 St Alkmond's Square; 52.70761°N 2.75168°W	—	c. 1800	A pair of brick houses with parapet eaves, three storeys, and three bays. The doorways have Doric columns carrying an entablature, and the windows are sashes.	II
10 St Alkmond's Square; 52.70755°N 2.75180°W	—	c. 1800	A brick house with a Welsh slate roof, three storeys and three bays. The central doorway has an architrave and a pediment, and the windows are sashes.	II
11 and 12 St Alkmond's Square; 52.70751°N 2.75186°W	—	c. 1800	A pair of brick houses with a Welsh slate roof hipped to the left. There are three storeys and five bays. The doorways have architraves and pedimented hoods, and the windows are sashes with stuccoed heads.	II
11 St Mary's Place; 52.70818°N 2.75162°W		c. 1800	A house, later a shop, on a corner site, in brick with a parapet eaves cornice, three storeys, three bays on St Mary's Place, and two on St Mary's Street. The doorway on St Mary's Place has a moulded architrave, and an entablature with console brackets. On St Mary's Street is a shop front, and the windows are sashes.	II
18, 19 and 20 St Mary's Street; 52.70821°N 2.75191°W		c. 1800	A row of three shops on a corner site with a moulded eaves cornice forming a parapet and a tile roof. There are three storeys, six bays on St Mary's Street, one bay on Church Street, and a bay in the canted corner between. In the ground floor are shop fronts, that to No. 20 probably original, consisting of a central doorway flanked by small-paned windows, outside which are further doorways, all under a single fascia. In the upper floors are sash windows and two blind windows.	II
7 and 8 Swan Hill and 1 Swan Hill Court; 52.70634°N 2.75644°W	—	c. 1800	Three brick houses on a corner site, with a moulded eaves cornice and a slate roof. There are three storeys, eight bays on Swan Hill and three on Swan Hill Court. The doorways have architraves, fanlights, and flat entablatures on curved console brackets. The windows are sashes with stuccoed heads.	II
16 Swan Hill; 52.70609°N 2.75704°W	—	c. 1800	A brick house with three storeys and an attic. The entrance front has two bays under a pedimented gable, and the right return along Swan Hill has three bays. The doorway has a moulded surround, a fanlight, and a cornice on consoles brackets, and the windows are sashes.	II
26 Town Walls, railings and walls 52.70527°N 2.75588°W	—	c. 1800	A brick house with an overhanging eaves cornice and a tile roof. There are two storeys and three bays, the right bay projecting and gabled. The doorway is approached up steps with cast iron railings, and it has a simple architrave. The windows are sashes, and attached to both sides of the house are portions of the town walls, which are in sandstone with flat copings.	II
27 and 28 Town Walls and railings 52.70537°N 2.75632°W	—	c. 1800	A pair of brick houses with plain overhanging eaves, and a Welsh slate roof with coped gables. There are two storeys with basements, and each house has three bays. The doorways in the outer bays have panelled architraves, the windows are sashes and there are blind windows. The basement area is enclosed by cast iron railings with spearhead and urn finials.	II
1 and 1A Wyle Cop; 52.70695°N 2.75190°W		c. 1800	A pair of brick shops with an earlier core. They have a moulded cornice, parapet eaves, three storeys, three bays, and a rear wing. In the ground floor are late 19th-century shop fronts, and the upper floors contain sash windows. In the rear wing is some exposed timber framing.	II
12 Wyle Cop; 52.70666°N 2.75117°W	—	c. 1800	A brick shop with a modillion eaves cornice and a tile roof. There are three storeys and three narrow bays. In the ground floor is an early 20th-century shop front with fluted pilasters and a dentilled fascia. The upper floors contain sash windows, the middle window in the central bay with a pediment.	II
26 Wyle Cop; 52.70629°N 2.75006°W		c. 1800	A brick shop with an eaves cornice and a parapet, three storeys and two bays. In the ground floor is an early 19th-century shop front with a small-paned window flanked by doors, and with a decorative cornice above. The upper floors contain sash windows.	II
46 and 47 Wyle Cop; 52.70623°N 2.74867°W		c. 1800	A pair of brick shops on a corner site with a Welsh slate roof. They have three storeys and a front of four bays. In the ground floor are two late 19th-century shop fronts with architraves and a continuous fascia. The left return is gabled, it has three bays, and contains a doorway with a fanlight and a pediment, and a shop window. Beyond that is a rear wing, lower and with three storeys, with a dentilled eaves band. The windows are sashes.	II
48 Wyle Cop; 52.70616°N 2.74879°W	—	c. 1800	A brick shop with a Welsh slate roof, three storeys and two bays. In the ground floor is a late 19th-century shop front with architraves to the door and window, and a continuous fascia. In the upper floors are sash windows with stuccoed heads.	II
56 and 57 Wyle Cop; 52.70606°N 2.74952°W		c. 1800	A pair of brick shops with a tile roof. There are three storeys and four bays. In the ground floor are shop fronts, and the upper floors contain sash windows with stuccoed heads.	II
81 Wyle Cop; 52.70681°N 2.75179°W	—	c. 1800	A shop in painted brick with a moulded cornice, and parapet eaves with a central pediment. There are three storeys and two bays. In the ground floor is a late 20th-century shop front, and the upper floors contain sash windows with sill bands on consoles brackets, and entablatures above.	II
84 Wyle Cop; 52.70688°N 2.75206°W	—	c. 1800	A brick shop with plain parapet eaves, three storeys and three bays. In the ground floor is a shop front with a recessed central doorway, a fascia on moulded console brackets, and a passage doorway to the right. The upper floors contain sash windows and one blind window.	II
Admiral Benbow Public House; 52.70696°N 2.75567°W		c. 1800	The public house, later raised in height, is in brick with a tile roof. There are three storeys, five bays, and an outshut at the rear. In the centre is a doorway with a moulded architrave and a hood on scrolled brackets. The windows are casements, and they contain mullions and transoms.	II
House, later part of a hospital 52.70584°N 2.75797°W	—	c. 1800	The house, later part of the Eye, Ear and Throat Hospital, is in brick with a Welsh slate roof. The main block has three storeys, and projecting to the front is a two-storey, three-bay range with a flat roof. This contains a doorway with a panelled architrave and a fanlight, and to its right is a square bay window. All the windows are sashes.	II
Sandford House; 52.70553°N 2.74980°W		c. 1800	A house built by Joseph Bromfield for himself, it is in brick with a Welsh slate roof. There are three storeys, two bays on the front, three on the sides, and a later block at the rear. In the centre of the front is a porch with columns and a pediment. On the garden front is a full-height octagonal bay window, and the other windows are sashes.	II*
The Bull Inn; 52.70826°N 2.75286°W		c. 1800	The public house is in painted brick and has three storeys and four bays. The doorways are in the outer bays, with a continuous window between, and above is a fascia on console brackets. In the upper floors are sash windows, and there is a wrought iron bracket for the inn sign.	II
St Julian's House; 52.70500°N 2.74962°W		c. 1820	A brick house with a Welsh slate roof, two storeys and three bays. The central doorway has a blind Gothick fanlight and an open pediment, and the windows are sashes.	II
Stone House; 52.70489°N 2.74938°W		c. 1820	The house is in brick with ashlar stone facing at the front and rendering elsewhere. It has Tuscan angle pilasters, a modillion cornice, and a Welsh slate roof. There are two storeys, a double-depth plan, and three bays. The central bay projects and contains a Greek Doric porch with two pairs of columns, an architrave with a triglyph frieze, and a latticed balcony. The windows are sashes. At the rear are bow windows, and a doorway with Greek Doric columns and an entablature.	II
45 High Street; 52.70703°N 2.75281°W	—	1823	A shop in painted brick with a string course, a moulded eaves cornice and a Welsh slate roof. There are four storeys and two bays. In the ground floor is a shop front, and the upper floors contain sash windows.	II
1 Belmont; 52.70648°N 2.75270°W		Early 19th century	A stuccoed house with a parapet, three storeys and four bays. The doorway in the left bay has a moulded surround and an entablature on brackets, and the windows are sashes.	II
2 Belmont; 52.70639°N 2.75276°W		Early 19th century	A stuccoed house, the ground floor rusticated, with a cornice, a parapet, and a shallow pediment. There are three storeys and three bays. In the outer bays are doorways with architraves and round-headed fanlights. The upper floors contain sash windows in architraves, the central window in the middle bay with a pediment on console brackets.	II
17 Belmont; 52.70528°N 2.75536°W	—	Early 19th century	A brick house, with channelled stuccoed on the ground floor, an eaves cornice and a hipped Welsh slate roof. There are three storeys and four bays. The doorway is recessed in a round-headed architrave and has a traceried fanlight. In the left bay the windows are blind, and elsewhere they are sashes.	II
18 and 19 Belmont; 52.70542°N 2.75520°W		Early 19th century	A pair of brick houses with a tile roof, three storeys and three bays. The doorways are in the centre and have architraves, the windows are sashes, and the window above the doorways is blind.	II
20 and 21 Belmont; 52.70545°N 2.75512°W	—	Early 19th century	A pair of brick houses with a dentilled eaves band and a tile roof. There are three storeys, and each house has two bays. The windows are sashes, and the doors have been renewed.	II
2 Church Street; 52.70788°N 2.75197°W	—	Early 19th century	A brick house with a tile roof, three storeys and one bay. The doorway has a plain architrave, and the windows are sashes with stuccoed heads.	II
2 College Hill; 52.70664°N 2.75402°W	—	Early 19th century	A house, later an office, it is in stuccoed brick with a Welsh slate roof. There are three storeys, one bay facing the street, the left return has a gabled bay and a lower rear wing. The doorway, facing the street, has a doorway with a fanlight and a pediment. The gabled bay contains a two-storey canted bay window, and the gable has bargeboards and a finial. In the rear wing is a single-storey bay window and moulded dentilled eaves. The windows are sashes.	II
8 College Hill; 52.70671°N 2.75479°W	—	Early 19th century	A stuccoed brick house with a slate roof, it has three storeys and a basement, and two bays. The doorway has an entablature with console brackets, and the windows are sashes.	II
8A College Hill; 52.70676°N 2.75503°W	—	Early 19th century	A warehouse, later used for other purposes, it is in brick. There are three storeys and four bays. The doorway has a moulded architrave, above it the loading bay has been converted into windows, and over it is are gabled eaves overhanging a pulley. The windows are sashes, and in the right bay is a wide segmentally-arched shop window.	II
Former stable buildings, 9 and 10 College Hill; 52.70678°N 2.75510°W	—	Early 19th century	The former stable buildings flank the entrance to the courtyard, and have since been used for other purposes. They are in brick with tile roofs. The buildings have a single storey, and the main doors face into the courtyard.	II
1 Cross Hill; 52.70670°N 2.75622°W		Early 19th century	A brick house with a moulded eaves cornice. There are three storeys, three bays, and a rounded corner to Swan Hill. The central doorway has a moulded architrave, a fanlight, and a keystone. The windows are sashes, in the ground floor they are set in round-arched recesses.	II
10 Dogpole; 52.70738°N 2.75120°W		Early 19th century	A shop, possibly originally a house, it is in brick with a sill band and a hipped Welsh slate roof. There are three storeys and two bays. In the ground floor is a shop front, and above are sash windows.	II
13 Dogpole; 52.70763°N 2.75144°W		Early 19th century	A brick shop with channelled stucco in the ground floor, and parapet eaves. There are four storeys and one bay. In the ground floor is a shop front, and the upper floors contain sash windows. Flanking the windows in the first and second floors are segmentally-arched recesses, above which is a string course.	II
19 Dogpole; 52.70730°N 2.75086°W	—	Early 19th century	A brick house with an eaves cornice and a hipped tile roof. There are two storeys and three bays. The windows are sashes with flat stuccoed heads.	II
22 Dogpole; 52.70684°N 2.75113°W	—	Early 19th century	A shop and a house, roughcast with rusticated stucco on the ground floor, and a sill band. There are three storeys, a front of five bays, and a rear wing of two storeys and three bays. In the centre of the ground floor is an archway, with a shop front to the right and paired windows to the left. The upper floors contain sash windows with stuccoed heads. In the rear wing is a doorway with a moulded architrave and a fanlight.	II
23 Dogpole; 52.70676°N 2.75124°W		Early 19th century	A brick shop with an eaves parapet surmounted by urns. There are three storeys and three bays. In the ground floor is an early 20th-century shop front with a moulded architrave and a dentilled fascia on console brackets. To the right is a round-arched passage entrance with wrought ironwork forming a tympanum. The upper floors contain sash windows.	II
1 Dogpole Court; 52.70679°N 2.75076°W	—	Early 19th century	A brick house with a moulded eaves cornice and a Welsh slate roof. There are three storeys, and an L-shaped plan with a canted corner, with one bay in each face, and there is a projecting wing. The doorway has a moulded architrave, a fanlight, and an entablature with console brackets. The windows are sashes, some are blind, and in the wing is a full-height canted bay window.	II
2 Dogpole Court; 52.70675°N 2.75093°W	—	Early 19th century	A house incorporating earlier material, built in two phases. It is in brick with dentilled eaves and a Welsh slate roof. To the left is a range with two storeys and one bay, and to the right is a range with three storeys and two bays. The doorway has a moulded architrave, a fanlight, and a hood on console brackets, and the windows are sashes.	II
40, 41 and 42 High Street; 52.70719°N 2.75306°W		Early 19th century	A row of three shops incorporating earlier material, in brick with a stuccoed eaves cornice and a Welsh slate roof. There are three storeys, and each shop has one bay. In the ground floor are shop fronts and an arched passage entry. The middle floor contains Venetian windows, the central window with a segmental pediment, and in the top floor are paired sash windows. In the passageway is some exposed timber framing.	II
48 High Street; 52.70693°N 2.75266°W	—	Early 19th century	A brick shop with plain eaves and a Welsh slate roof. There are four storeys and two bays. In the ground floor is a shop front, and the upper floors contain sash windows.	II
2–8 Marine Terrace; 52.70605°N 2.74800°W		Early 19th century	A terrace of seven brick houses with Welsh slate roofs, curving at the north end. They have three storeys and eleven bays. The windows are sash windows, some doorways have fanlights, and there are attic dormers.	II
4 Milk Street; 52.70657°N 2.75260°W	—	Early 19th century	A house, later a shop, with a possible earlier timber framed core, it is in painted brick, with an eaves parapet and a tile roof. There are three storeys and two bays. In the ground floor is a shop front flanked by doorways, and the upper floors contain sash windows with stuccoed heads.	II
16 and 16A Princess Street; 52.70676°N 2.75303°W	—	Early 19th century	A house, later a shop, with possibly an earlier core, it is in brick with a high parapet and a Welsh slate roof. There are three storeys, one bay on the front, and a two-storey rear wing. On the front is a shop front with a central bow window and flanking doors, and the upper floors contain sash windows. In the left return is a doorway with an architrave, and the rear wing contains a shop front.	II
26 Princess Street; 52.70693°N 2.75382°W	—	Early 19th century	A shop in rendered brick with a slate roof, three storeys, and three bays. In the ground floor is a 19th-century shop front with a central doorway and a fascia on curved consoles. In the upper floors are sash windows.	II
5–9 St Mary's Street; 52.70805°N 2.75152°W		Early 19th century	A row of five houses, later shops and offices, they are in brick with parapet eaves and a Welsh slate roof. They have three storeys and eight bays. In the ground floor are shop fronts, and the upper floors contain sash windows. Attached to the right of No. 9 is a former lodge with two storeys and one bay, a hipped roof, a square bay window in the side, and casement windows above.	II
10 St Mary's Street; 52.70783°N 2.75135°W		Early 19th century	The building, at one time a lodge, is on a corner site, and is in brick with a hipped Welsh slate roof. There are two storeys, one bay on St Mary's Street, and three gabled bays on the left return. On the front is a doorway with panelled rebates, and a pediment, and to the left is a full height segmental arch. The windows are sashes, and in the left return there are two sash windows to each bay.	II
16 St Mary's Street; 52.70798°N 2.75171°W		Early 19th century	A brick shop with plain parapet eaves, three storeys and three bays. In the ground floor is a shop front, and the upper storeys contain sash windows.	II
9 and 10 St Julian's Friars; 52.70551°N 2.74935°W		Early 19th century	A pair of houses, later used for other purposes, they are in brick with a Welsh slate roof. There are three storeys and each house has two bays. The doorways have moulded architraves, fanlights, and flat hoods on console brackets. The windows are sashes and have stuccoed heads with voussoirs.	II
14 and 15 Swan Hill and railings 52.70638°N 2.75639°W	—	Early 19th century	A pair of brick houses with a parapet and coped gables. There are four storeys and basements, and each house has one bay. The doorways have moulded surrounds, and each has a cornice with console brackets. The windows are sashes, and enclosing the basement area are iron railings.	II
15A Swan Hill; 52.70594°N 2.75702°W	—	Early 19th century	A pair of brick houses with string courses, a dentilled eaves cornice, and a tile roof with coped gables. There are two storeys and five bays, the outer bays narrower, and a pediment containing a circular window over the middle three bays. In the outer bays are doorways with pediments on consoles, and the windows are casements.	II
22 Swan Hill; 52.70666°N 2.75616°W		Early 19th century	A brick house with a string course, a parapet eaves cornice, three storeys and four bays. The doorway has a moulded architrave, a fanlight, and a keystone, and the windows are sashes.	II
2 and 3 The Square; 52.70783°N 2.75429°W	—	Early 19th century	A shop in stuccoed brick with a sill band and a cornice above, a moulded eaves cornice, and a Welsh slate roof. There are three storeys and four bays. In the ground floor is a 20th-century shop front, and to the right is a doorway with a moulded architrave and cornice and a panel above. The middle floor contains Italianate round-arched sash windows, and in the top floor are smaller sash windows with architraves.	II
4 The Square; 52.70772°N 2.75440°W	—	Early 19th century	A shop in brick with lined-out stucco, a string course with an interlace frieze, a modillion eaves cornice, and a Welsh slate roof. There are three storeys and an attic, and four bays. In the ground floor is a 20th-century shop front. The first floor contains mullioned and transomed windows with shouldered architraves, the top floor has windows with architraves, and in the attic are moulded pilasters and casement windows.	II
5 Town Walls; 52.70582°N 2.75711°W	—	Early 19th century	The house is in lined-out stucco and has a slate roof. There are two storeys, three bays, and a rear wing. The doorway has a plain surround, and the windows are sashes.	II
5 Wyle Cop; 52.70686°N 2.75152°W	—	Early 19th century	A brick shop with a band, a parapet, and a tile roof with coped gables. There are three storeys and two bays. On the ground floor is a shop front and a doorway to the left, and the upper floors contain sash windows.	II
10 and 11 Wyle Cop; 52.70667°N 2.75118°W		Early 19th century	A pair of brick shops with a string course, a parapet with recessed panels, and a Welsh slate mansard roof. There are three storeys and attics, and four bays. In the ground floor are shop fronts flanked by rusticated stuccoed pilasters, over which is a deep fascia. In the upper floors are tripartite sash windows in moulded architraves flanked by sash windows with keystones. Above, No. 10 has a plain eaves cornice, No. 11 has a modillion cornice, and in the roof are dormers.	II
51 and 52 Wyle Cop; 52.70611°N 2.74908°W	—	Early 19th century	A pair of shops in painted brick with a Welsh slate roof, three storeys and five bays. In the ground floor are shop fronts, and the upper floors contain a mix of sash windows and blind windows.	II
58 and 59 Wyle Cop; 52.70606°N 2.74963°W		Early 19th century	A pair of brick shops with a moulded eaves cornice and a Welsh slate roof. There are four storeys and four bays. In the ground floor are shop fronts, and in the upper floors are sash windows and some blind windows, most with stuccoed heads.	II
60 Wyle Cop; 52.70612°N 2.75007°W		Early 19th century	A brick shop on a corner site, with a sill band, a stuccoed eaves cornice and a parapet. There are three storeys, three bays on Wyle Cop, three on Beech Lane, and a curved bay on the corner. In the ground floor is a stuccoed shop front with recessed windows, and on the Beech Lane front is a doorway with an architrave and a flat entablature. The windows are sashes, the window in the middle floor of the curved bay being tripartite.	II
Former warehouse, Drayton Passage; 52.70749°N 2.75505°W	—	Early 19th century	The former warehouse is in brick with a dentilled eaves cornice, and a tile roof with a coped gable. There are three storeys and an attic. The building contains wide loading doors, gabled doors in the attic, a doorway with a flat lintel, and windows. There are also blocked doorways and windows.	II
Severn Court; 52.70659°N 2.74854°W	—	Early 19th century	A terrace of seven brick houses on a stone plinth with a Welsh slate roof. There are three storeys and basements, and 13 bays, with a concave bay on the left. In the basements are cast iron windows, and the upper floors contain sash windows with stuccoed heads.	II
St John's Row; 52.70628°N 2.75803°W		Early 19th century	A pair of brick houses with a Welsh slate roof, three storeys and two bays each. Both houses have a central doorway with an architrave and a pediment on console brackets, and the windows are sashes with stuccoed heads.	II
Former warehouse, Wyle Cop; 52.70609°N 2.75021°W		Early 19th century	The former warehouse, later incorporated into a shop, is in brick with dentilled eaves and a tile roof. There are four storeys and three bays. The right bay contains a loading bay up to the second floor where there is a door, and at the top is a gable for a hoist. In the other bays, there are full-height shop windows in the ground floor, and above are sash windows and one casement window.	II
Crescent Place; 52.70533°N 2.75557°W		Early 19th century	A terrace of five houses in brick with stuccoed ground floors, an eaves cornice on console brackets, and a Welsh slate roof. There are three storeys, and each house has two bays. In the ground floor are paired doorways with fluted Doric columns and architraves, sash windows, and arched recesses. The middle floor contains tripartite sash windows with architraves on scrolled console brackets, and in the top floor are smaller sash windows with moulded architraves.	II
Yorkshire House Public House; 52.70884°N 2.75180°W		Early 19th century	The public house is in brick with parapet eaves, and a tile roof with a coped gable to the right. There are three storeys and three bays. The doorway has a moulded architrave and a pedimented hood, and the windows are sashes with stuccoed heads.	II
The Parade Shopping Centre; 52.70846°N 2.75068°W		1827–30	Originally the Royal Salop Infirmary designed by Edward Haycock, it was later extended, and in 1980–83 was converted into a shopping centre and flats. The building is faced in Grinshill sandstone, and is in Greek Revival style. There are three storeys and attics, and a front of eleven bays, the outer bays projecting. The middle five bays contain a Greek Doric portico with four fluted columns and a pediment with a triglyph frieze. At the rear are cast iron balconies.	II
Masonic Hall; 52.70687°N 2.75486°W		c. 1830	The former Masonic Hall, later part of the Music Hall, is in Greek Revival style. It is built in stuccoed brick with stone dressings and a Welsh slate roof. There are five bays that are divided and flanked by pilasters. In the ground floor are two doorways and a blind recess, in the upper part the second and fourth bays contain sash windows, and at the top of each bay is a laurel wreath in low-relief. The building is surmounted by a large pediment, and along the sides are seven bays.	II
Former First Church of Christ Scientist and railings 52.70543°N 2.75655°W		1834	Originally a Methodist chapel, it has since been converted for other uses. The chapel is built in stuccoed brick, and has a high parapet, a central pediment, and acroteria at the ends. There are five bays flanked and divided by Corinthian pilasters carrying an entablature. On the front are two projecting porches with fluted Greek Doric columns and pedimented heads. The windows are round-headed with Doric pilasters, and are set in round-headed recesses. At the front the basement area is enclosed by cast iron railings with spearhead finials.	II
15 Wyle Cop; 52.70656°N 2.75107°W	—	Early to mid-19th century	A brick shop with a moulded eaves cornice and a Welsh slate roof. There are four storeys and three bays. In the ground floor is an early 20th-century shop front, and above is a two-storey oriel window, with sash windows above and flanking it.	II
16 Wyle Cop; 52.70649°N 2.75096°W	—	Early to mid-19th century	A brick shop with a moulded eaves cornice and a Welsh slate roof. There are four storeys and four bays. In the ground floor is a late 20th-century shop front, and the upper floors contain sash windows and one blind window.	II
1 College Hill; 52.70654°N 2.75382°W		1838–39	Built as a bank, designed by Edward Haycock, and later used for other purposes, it is in ashlar stone, stuccoed on the sides, and has a slate roof. There are two storeys, the front facing the street has three bays, and there are eight bays on the sides. The ground floor of the front is rusticated and it contains three round-arched windows. In the upper storey are sash windows in moulded architraves divided by pilasters, and at the top is an entablature and a pediment. In the west return is a porch.	II
The Music Hall; 52.70720°N 2.75473°W		1838–40	The building originated as a civic hall designed by Edward Haycock in Classical style, and has been converted for other uses. It is built in Grinshill sandstone, and has three storeys and five bays. The ground floor is rusticated, the middle three bays project, and the upper storeys have Ionic columns, an entablature and a pediment. The windows are sashes with architraves, and some have pediments.	II
Unitarian Church; 52.70733°N 2.75327°W		1839–40	The front was added to the church in 1885, which is in stone, and has three bays, flanked and divided by pilasters with fluted caps. The central entrance has a segmental pediment, above which is a round-headed window, and a deep cornice containing an inscribed pedimented cartouche. The outer bays contain a flat-headed window with a round-headed window above, all in a round-headed arch.	II
The Centre House; 52.70970°N 2.75021°W	—	c. 1840	Formerly part of The Old Council House and now a separate dwelling, the house is in brick with a tile roof. There are two storeys and two bays. The left bay is recessed and contains a doorway and mullioned and transomed windows with hood moulds, and the right bay is gabled and contains casements. In the roof is a small dormer.	II
The Nun's House; 52.70978°N 2.74988°W	—	c. 1840	Originally a wing of The Old Council House, later a separate dwelling, it is in brick with a tiled half-hipped roof. There are two storeys and two bays. On the front is a gabled porch, and the windows are casements.	II
Shrewsbury Railway Station; 52.71182°N 2.74989°W		1849	The station building was designed by T. M. Penson in Tudor style for the Shrewsbury and Chester Railway, it was extended by him in 1855, and further extended in 1903. The station is built in Grinshill sandstone and has Welsh slate roofs. There are three storeys and 25 bays, divided into four principal bays by polygonal buttresses with finials. The left wing projects forward, there are string courses and quatrefoil panels between the storeys and a parapet with pierced panels. Over the entrance is a four-storey tower with an oriel window and a clock face. The other windows are mullioned and transomed with hood moulds.	II
The Corn House; 52.70606°N 2.74973°W		c. 1850	Originally a corn warehouse and corn merchant's house, later used for other purposes. It is in brick and has a Welsh slate roof with stepped corbelling to coped gables. There are four storeys, three bays on the gabled front to the street, and six bays on the right return, the rear two bays from the former merchant's house. On the front is a shop front, the first floor contains French doors, and the windows have cast iron frames in blue brick segmental arches. Along the return are pilasters with windows similar to the front, the last two bays containing sash windows and a shop front and doorway.	II
23 Belmont; 52.70590°N 2.75387°W	—	Mid-19th century	A brick house with a Welsh slate roof, two storeys and four bays. In the ground floor are four arches with keystones, the left arch containing a doorway, the right arch blind, and the middle two arches containing sash windows. In the upper floor are two casement windows with segmental heads.	II
9 Wyle Cop and 1, 2 and 3 Dogpole; 52.70686°N 2.75134°W	—	Mid-19th century	A row of three shops with flats above on a corner site incorporating earlier material. They are in brick with stone dressings and a tile roof. The front on Dogpole has three storeys and attics and nine bays, and the front on Wyle Cop has two bays, four storeys and a coped gable with a finial. There are shop fronts on both fronts, and various doorways. The windows are sashes, with lintels of varying shapes, some with trefoil lights in the tympanum.	II
13 St Mary's Street; 52.70783°N 2.75156°W		Mid-19th century	A brick shop with a moulded sill band, a moulded eaves cornice, and a hipped Welsh slate roof. There are three storeys and three bays. In the ground floor is a shop front with a recessed doorway and another doorway to the right. Above these is a continuous fascia with moulded consoles over panelled architraves. The upper floors contain sash windows with keystones.	II
Clerk to the Justices Building; 52.70694°N 2.75542°W		Mid-19th century	An office in brick on a corner site, with ashlar facing, a string course, and an overhanging moulded eaves cornice. There are two storeys, three bays on College Hill, one bay on Swan Hill, and a canted bay on the corner. Above the doorway is a pediment, and the windows are sashes with voussoirs and keystones.	II
Lane End House; 52.70588°N 2.75856°W	—	Mid-19th century	A stuccoed brick house with a Welsh slate roof. There are two storeys and an attic, a front of four bays, two parallel gabled ranges with hipped roofs, and a lower two-storey bay to the right with an embattled parapet. Along the ground floor is a wrought iron canopy. The doorway has an architrave and a hood on brackets, and the windows are sashes.	II
Former School, St Alkmond's Square; 52.70736°N 2.75185°W	—	Mid-19th century	The former school, which has an earlier core, is in brick with a Welsh slate roof. There are two storeys and two bays, the right bay gabled. The windows are mullioned, and there is a doorway in a recessed bay to the right.	II
Shrewsbury Cathedral; 52.70533°N 2.75403°W		1853–56	The Roman Catholic cathedral was designed by Edward Welby Pugin, the southeast chapel was added in 1901, and the west porch in 1906–07, both by Edmund Kirby. The cathedral is built in Grinshill sandstone and has a tile roof. It consists of a nave with a clerestory, lean-to north and south aisles with east chapels, a lower chancel and a chapel with a polygonal apse. On the west gable is a corbelled-out elaborate bellcote, and the west window has six lights with Geometrical tracery. In the gable above the west porch is a canopy over a statue.	II*
4 College Hill; 52.70661°N 2.75433°W		c. 1860	A house, later an office, in Gothic style. It is in red brick with dressings in yellow and blue brick and a tile roof. There are two storeys and four bays, the right three bays projecting slightly, over which is a half-hipped gable. The doorway is recessed in a moulded arch, and the windows are mullioned and transomed. In the left bay is a half-hipped dormer.	II
Statue of Lord Clive; 52.70779°N 2.75401°W		c. 1860	The statue of Lord Clive in The Square is by Baron Marochetti. It consists of a life-size bronze statue on a polished granite base.	II
Wall and gate adjoining Shrewsbury Cathedral; 52.70515°N 2.75412°W	—	c. 1860	The wall is in sandstone with buttresses and raking coping. It contains a small lych gate with a lead roof on timber struts with a cross finial.	II
Water pump adjacent to Watch Tower; 52.70534°N 2.75597°W	—	c. 1870	The water pump is in cast iron. It has a short fluted shaft with raised lettering and a lion's head motif, and is surmounted by a restored fluted cap.	II
Memorial Drinking Fountain; 52.70473°N 2.74959°W		1874	The memorial is to William Jones Clement, a surgeon, it is in stone, and consists of a drinking fountain surmounted by an obelisk. The memorial has a high plinth, fountain basins with gablets, decorative panels, a bust of Clement, and an inscription.	II
46 and 47 High Street; 52.70697°N 2.75274°W	—	Late 19th century	Possibly a refronted earlier building, it has applied timber framing and a tile roof. There are three storeys and two bays. In the ground floor is a 19th-century shop front with recessed doorways, curved windows, slender mullions, and a copper sill. In the middle floor are two mullioned and transomed oriel windows with jettying above. In the top floor are two mullioned and transomed windows, over which is a coved jettied gable that has bargeboards with interlace decoration and finials.	II
Pillar Box, The Square; 52.70752°N 2.75461°W		Late 19th century	The pillar box is in cast iron, and has an octagonal plan and an acorn finial.	II
St Julian's House; 52.70751°N 2.75164°W	—	Late 19th century	A vicarage, later a private house, it incorporates an earlier core, and was refronted in 1878. It is in brick with applied timber framing and has a tile roof. There are two storeys and three bays. In the centre is a full-height gabled porch with a stone plinth. The doorway has a four-centred arched head and an inscribed lintel, and the gable has ornate bargeboards. The windows are a mix of casements and lancets, and there is a mullioned and transomed window and an oriel window. The rear is timber framed with brick nogging.	II
Eye, Ear and Throat Hospital; 52.70578°N 2.75762°W		1879–81	The hospital, extended in 1926 and later converted into flats, is in red brick and terracotta, and has roofs of Welsh slate with terracotta cresting, and three storeys. It has an asymmetrical plan, and its features include mullioned and transomed windows, oriel windows, and a tower with a timber belvedere.	II
21 High Street; 52.70789°N 2.75376°W		1892	Commercial premises in Free Renaissance style, built in brick with stone dressings and a tile roof. There are three storeys and an attic, and four bays. In the ground floor is a central window flanked by doorways with fluted shafts and arcaded fanlights. The upper floors contain windows with flat or round heads, and above the second floor is a frieze of foliate swags and an egg-and-dart cornice. At the top of the building is an ornate three-tier gable flanked by balustrades, and surmounted by a pedimented panel with a coat of arms.	II
23 and 23A Swan Hill; 52.70687°N 2.75582°W		1893	Originally a police station, later converted for other uses, it is built in brick, faced in Grinshill ashlar sandstone, and has a Welsh slate roof. There are three storeys, a main block of five bays, a full-height carriage entrance to the left, and to the left of that a smaller block with two narrow bays. In the ground floor of the main block are rusticated pilasters and doorways. The windows are sashes in moulded architraves, between the upper floors is a foliate frieze, and at the top is a cornice and urns. The archway has a mask keystone and a triple window above.	II
The Wheatsheaf Public House; 52.70688°N 2.75256°W		c. 1900	The public house is on a corner site, it has an earlier core, and has been refronted with applied timber framing. It has a tile roof, two storeys with attics, and three bays. In the ground floor is a public house front, with the doorway in the angle, and above this is a continuous fascia on console brackets. The upper floor contains casement windows, and there are three gabled roof dormers.	II
Former Nurses Home; 52.70900°N 2.75073°W		1910	The nurses' home, later converted into flats, is in red Ruabon brick with stone dressings, string courses, quoins, a modillion eaves cornice and a green slate roof. It consists of a central block with flanking projecting wings. The central block has three storeys and attics, and five bays, the right bay projecting with a Diocletian window at the top. The doorway to its left has a moulded architrave with a Gibbs surround, and a decorative pediment. The block also contains an oriel window with a balustraded parapet, and it has a mansard roof with five dormers. The wings have four storeys, the left with a hipped roof, and the right with a pediment.	II
14 and 15 Dogpole; 52.70772°N 2.75163°W	—	Undated	A pair of stuccoed brick houses, probably incorporating earlier timber framed material, with a Welsh slate roof. There are three storeys and three bays, the left bay with an open pediment, and a wing to the left. The windows are sashes.	II

== See also ==
- Listed buildings in Shrewsbury (northwest central area)
- Listed buildings in Shrewsbury (outer areas)

== See also ==
- Listed buildings in Shrewsbury (northwest central area)
- Listed buildings in Shrewsbury (outer areas)
