= Shrewsbury Castle =

- Shrewsbury, Shropshire
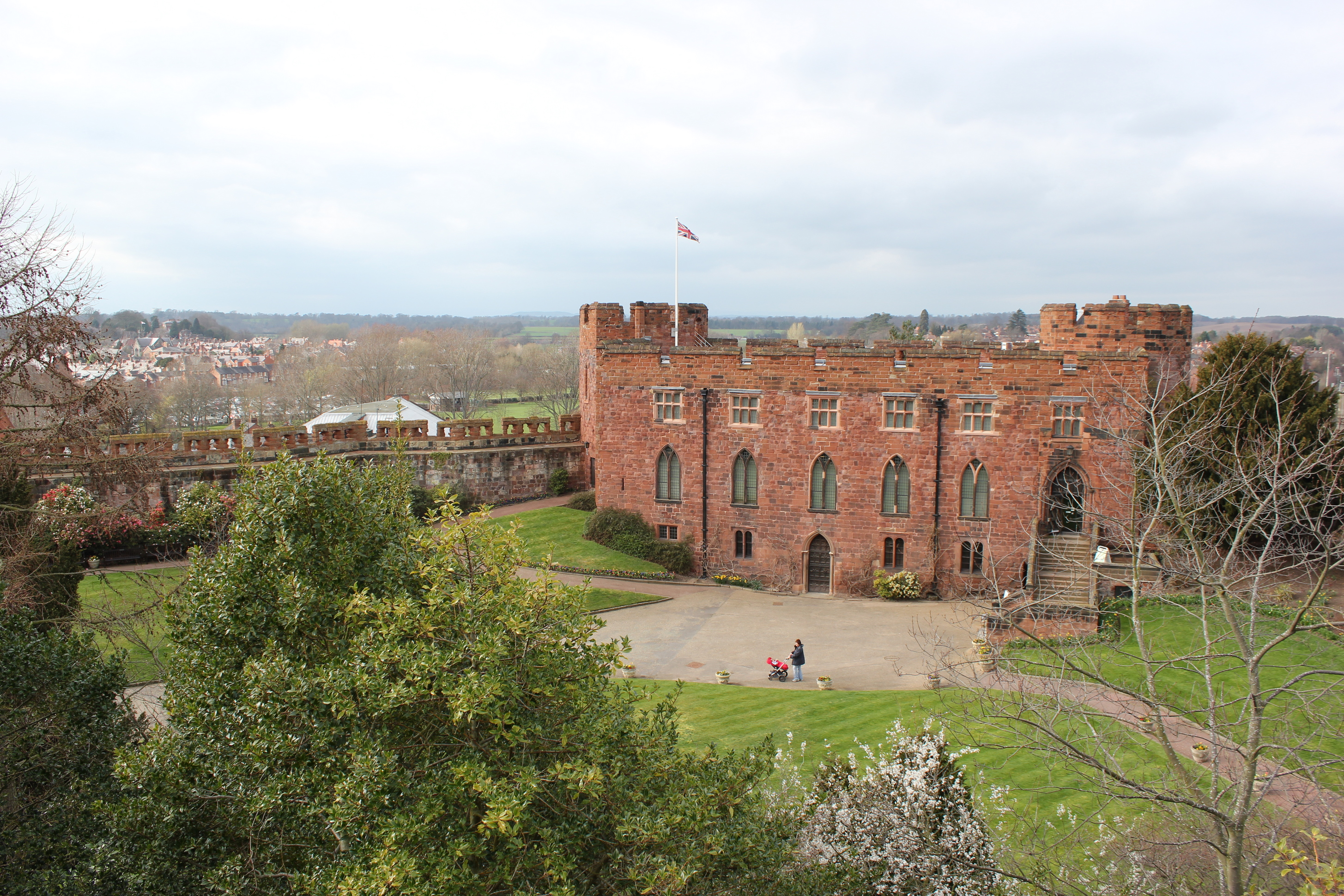
- Shrewsbury Castle

Site information
- Owner: Shropshire Council

Location
- Location within Shropshire
- Coordinates: 52°42′40″N 02°44′58″W

Site history
- Built: 1070

Listed Building – Grade I
- Designated: 10 January 1953
- Reference no.: 1246877

Shrewsbury Castle is a red sandstone castle in Shrewsbury, Shropshire, England. It stands on a hill in the neck of the meander of the River Severn on which the town originally developed. The castle, directly above Shrewsbury railway station, is a Grade I listed building.

== History ==
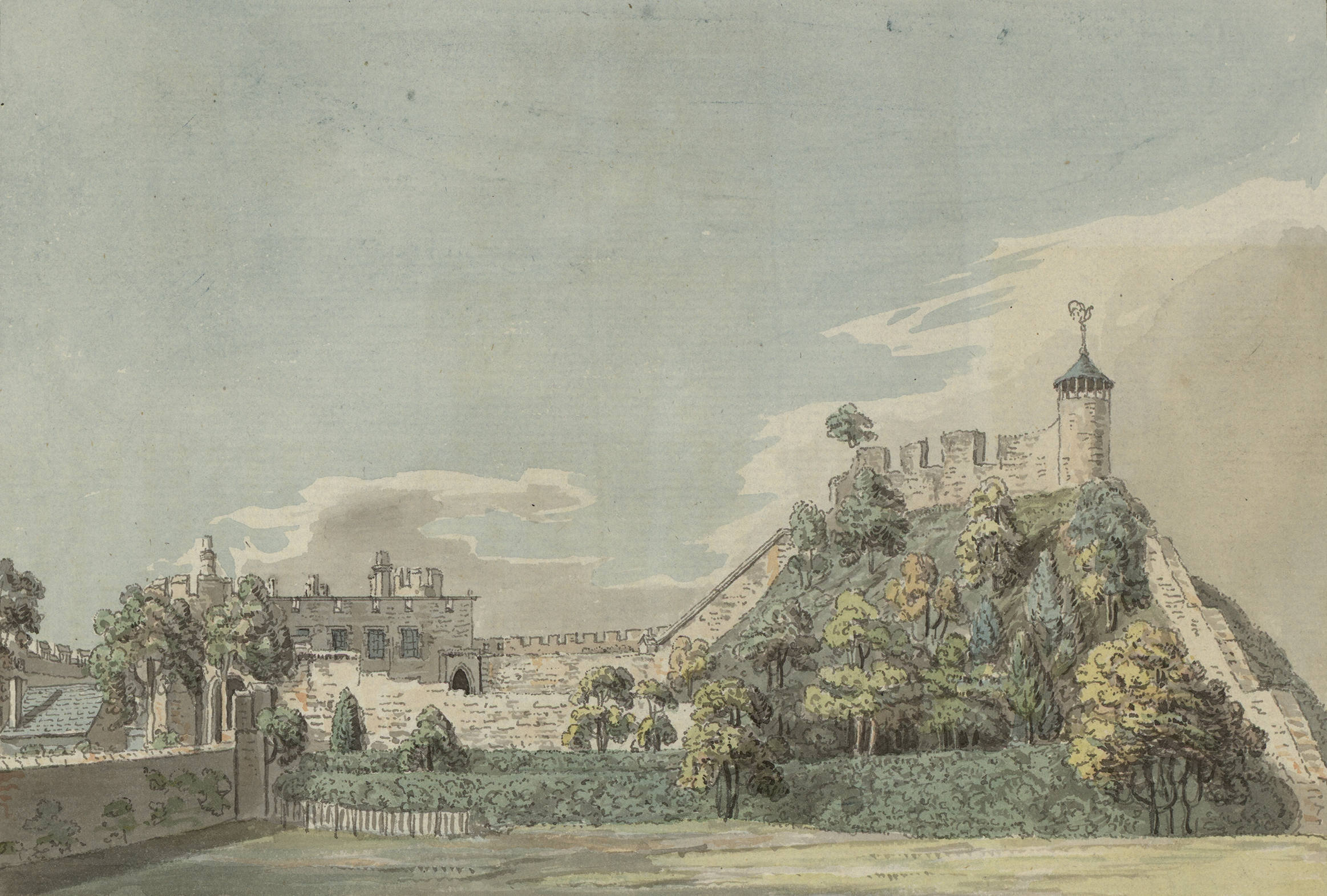
Shrewsbury Castle, c.1778

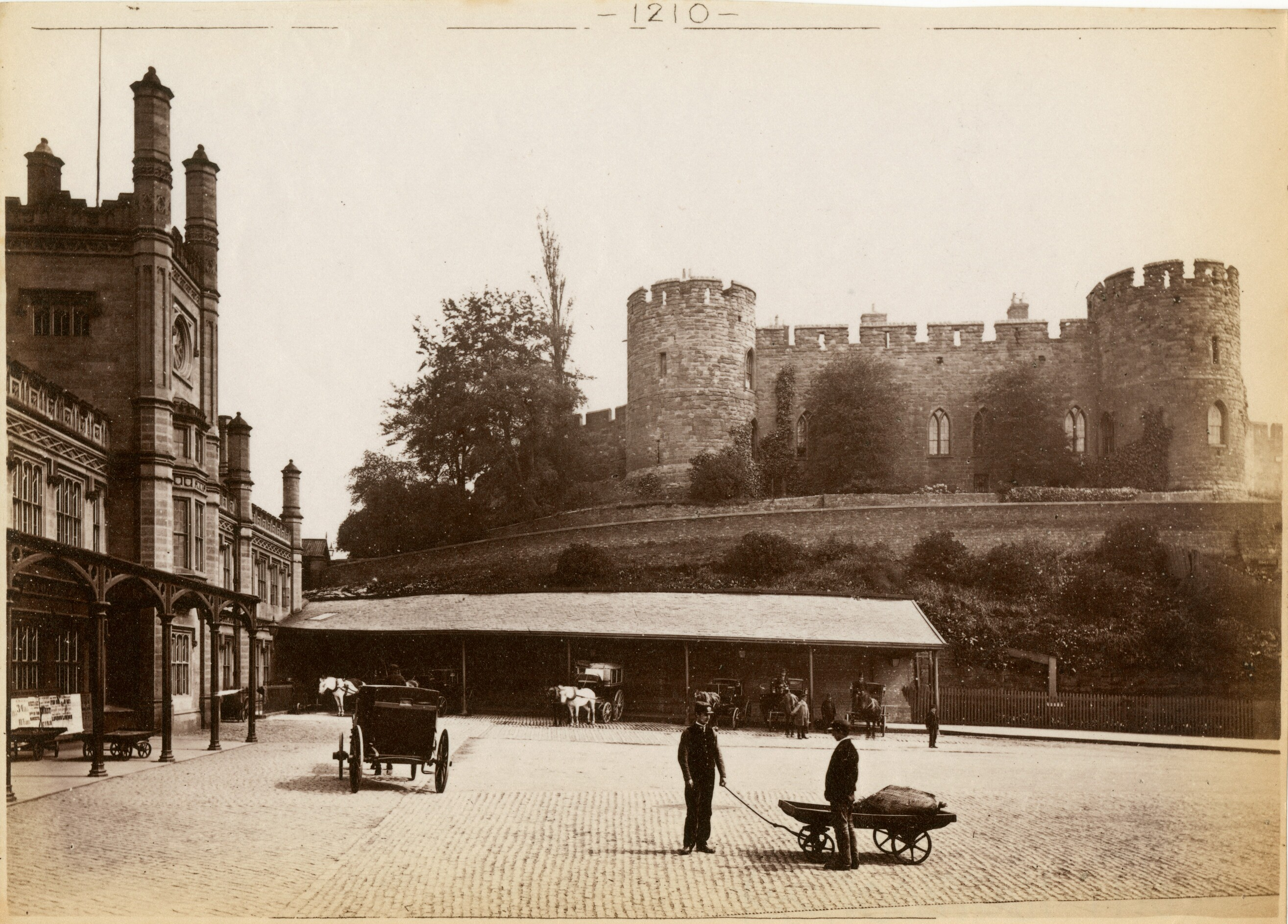
Shrewsbury Railway station and Castle by Francis Bedford, c. 1863–1884

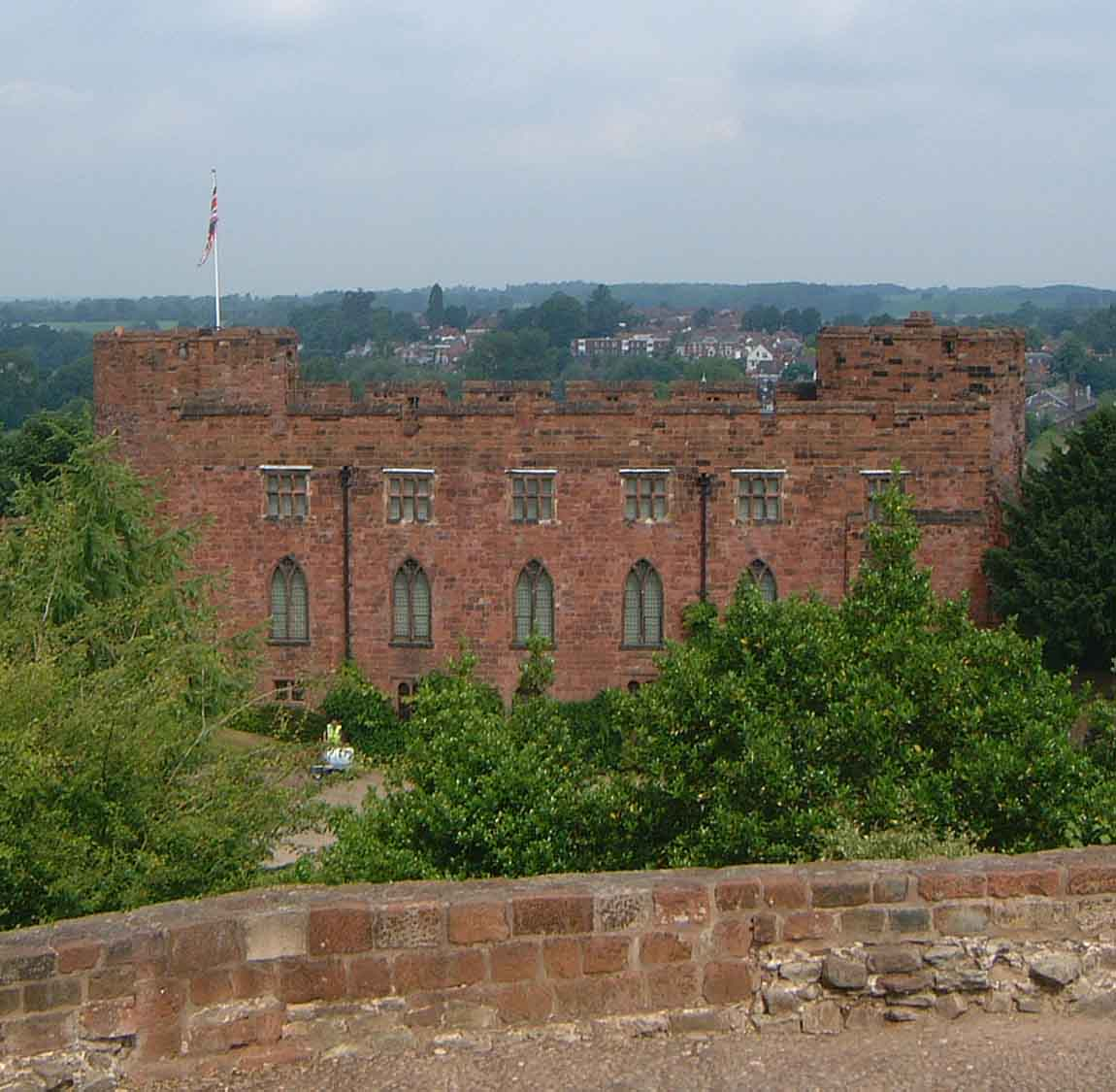
Shrewsbury Castle viewed from Laura's Tower

A castle was ordered on the site by William I c. 1067 but it was greatly extended under Roger de Montgomery circa 1070 as a base for operations into Wales, an administrative centre and as a defensive fortification for the town, which was otherwise protected by the loop of the river. Town walls, of which little now remains, were later added to the defences, as a response to Welsh raids and radiated out from the castle and surrounded the town; the area known as Town Walls still has a small section of them and a single tower, known as Town Walls Tower, which is in the care of the National Trust. At the start of the civil war between King Stephen and the Empress Matilda, the castle was held by William Fitz Alan, lord of Oswestry and Clun, on behalf of Matilda. After a short siege in 1138, King Stephen took the castle and had the surviving garrison hanged from the battlements.

The castle was briefly held by Llywelyn the Great, Prince of Wales, in 1215. Parts of the original medieval structure remain largely incorporating the inner bailey of the castle; the outer bailey, which extended into the town, has long ago vanished under the encroachment of later shops and other buildings. Having fallen into decay after c. 1300 (at the end of the Welsh wars) the castle became a domestic residence during the reign of Elizabeth I and passed to the ownership of the town council c.1600. The castle was extensively repaired in 1643 during the Civil War and was briefly besieged by Parliamentary forces from Wem before its surrender. It was acquired by Sir Francis Newport in 1663. Further repairs were carried out by Thomas Telford on behalf of Sir William Pulteney, MP for Shrewsbury, after 1780 to the designs of the architect Robert Adam.

The Shropshire Horticultural Society purchased the castle from a private owner, then Lord Barnard, and gave it to the town in 1924 and it became the location of Shrewsbury's Borough Council chambers for over 50 years. The castle was internally restructured to become the home of the Shropshire Regimental Museum when it moved from Copthorne Barracks and other local sites in 1985. The museum was attacked by the IRA on 25 August 1992 and extensive damage to the collection and to some of the Castle resulted. The museum was officially re-opened by Princess Alexandra on 2 May 1995. In 2019 it was rebranded as the Soldiers of Shropshire Museum.

In 2019 and 2020 an archaeology project by Shropshire Council and the University of Chester undertook excavations in the castle. Work in 2019 found the remains of the original ditch surrounding the motte of c.1067, along with a range of medieval pottery and two arrow heads or crossbow-bolt heads. Excavations in 2020 failed to locate St Michael's chapel, but did recover evidence of 'high-status feasting', including the bones of a pike and possibly a swan.

== Collection ==
The museum combines the collections of the King's Shropshire Light Infantry and the Shropshire Yeomanry holding items such as a lock of Napoleon Bonaparte's hair, the Grand Admiral's Baton belonging to Karl Dönitz, and the Victoria Crosses of Captain Alfred Kirke Ffrench, Private Charles Irwin and Sergeant Major Harold Whitfield.

Laura's Tower overlooks the surrounding townscape and countryside and is sometimes used as a backdrop for functions and weddings.

== See also ==
- History of Shrewsbury
- Listed buildings in Shrewsbury (southeast central area)
- King's Shropshire Light Infantry
- Ludlow Castle, another English Marches stronghold
- One Corpse Too Many – an historical fiction by Ellis Peters, based on an 1138 battle between Stephen, King of England and supporters of the Empress Matilda
