= Coade stone =

Artificial stoneware, produced 1770–1833

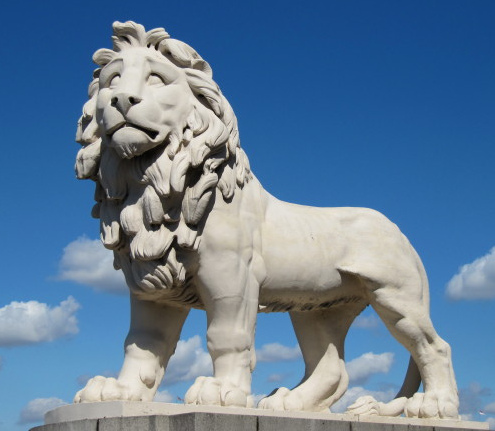
The South Bank Lion, on Westminster Bridge. Modelled by William F. Woodington and Grade II* listed by English Heritage. (See § Examples: South Bank Lion.)

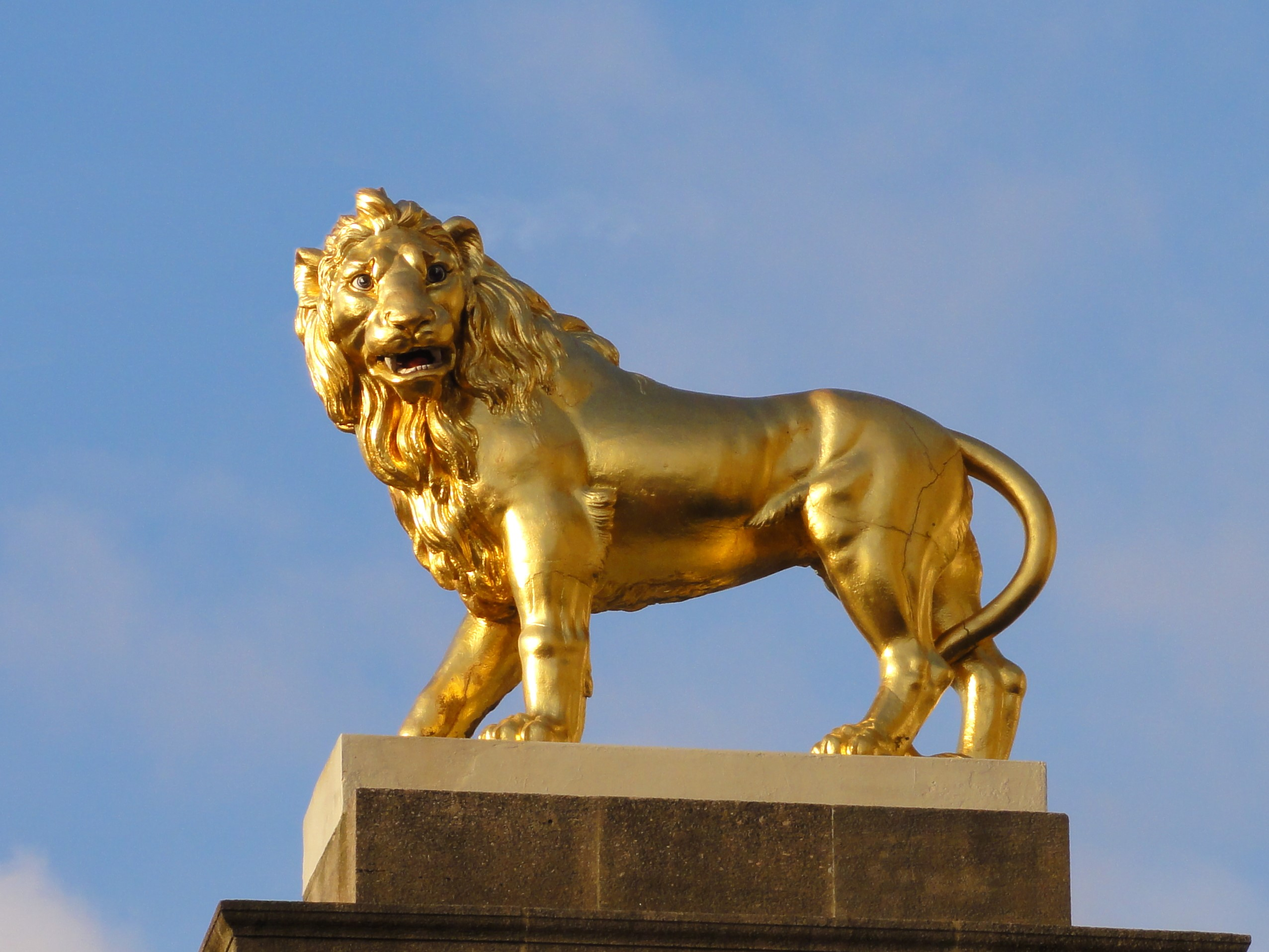
Twickenham Stadium Lion gate, (R.F.U.) Originally paired with the "South Bank Lion" at the Lion Brewery on the Lambeth bank of the River Thames. (See § Examples: Twickenham Stadium Lion.)

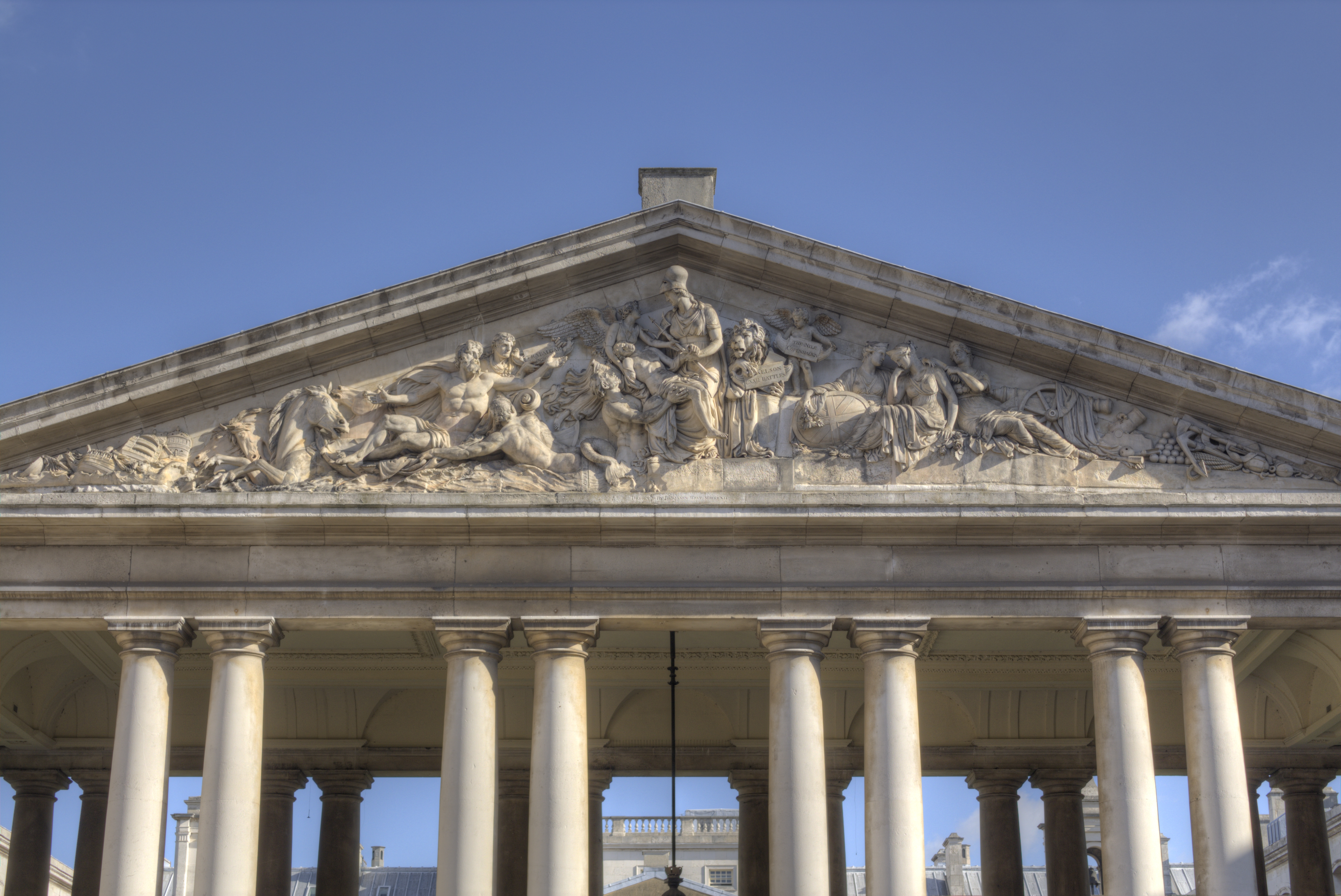
Admiral Lord Nelson's Pediment, Old Royal Naval College, Greenwich (See § Examples: Nelson Pediment.)

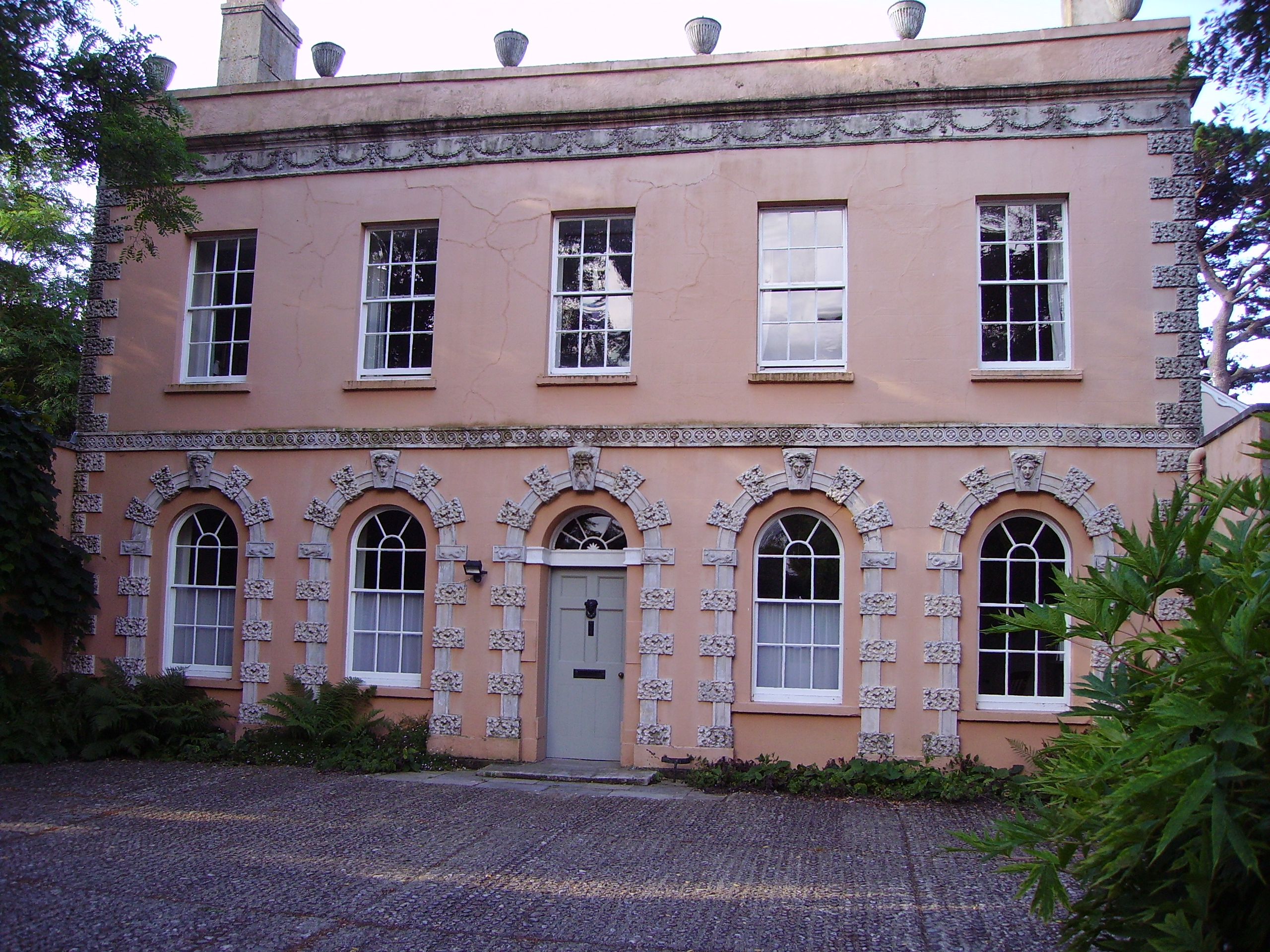
Eleanor Coade's home, Belmont House, in Lyme Regis, Dorset, with Coade stone ornamental façade (See § Examples: Belmont House.)

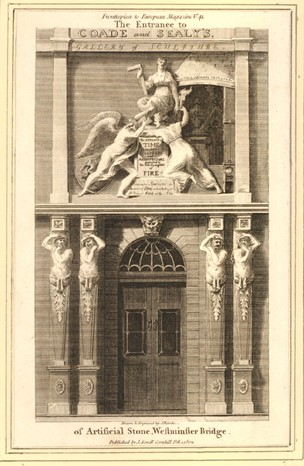
Coade and Sealy's Gallery of Sculpture, Westminster Bridge, 1799 (See § History: Coade and Sealy.)

Coade stone, also called Lithodipyra or Lithodipra, (Ancient Greek: λίθος/δίς/πυρά, lit. 'stone fired twice') is stoneware that was often described as an artificial stone in the late 18th and early 19th centuries. It was used for moulding neoclassical statues, architectural decorations and garden ornaments of the highest quality that remain virtually weatherproof today.

Coade stone features were produced by appointment to George III and the Prince Regent for St George's Chapel, Windsor; The Royal Pavilion, Brighton; Carlton House, London; the Royal Naval College, Greenwich; and refurbishment of Buckingham Palace in the 1820s.

Coade stone was prized by the most important architects, such as: John Nash (Buckingham Palace), Sir John Soane (Bank of England), Robert Adam (Kenwood House), and James Wyatt (Radcliffe Observatory).

The product (originally known as Lithodipyra) was created around 1770 by Eleanor Coade, who ran Coade's Artificial Stone Manufactory, Coade and Sealy, and Coade in Lambeth, London, from 1769 until her death in 1821. It continued to be manufactured by her last business partner, William Croggon, until 1833.

== History ==
In 1769, Mrs Coade (Note: There is some modern confusion between Eleanor and her mother (Eleanor, Elinore), as to which one ran the factory. This is primarily because of Miss Eleanor Coade's customary use of the title Mrs because this was a commonplace 'courtesy title' for any unmarried woman in business. However, analysis of the bills shows that Eleanor Coade (daughter) was fully in charge from 1771. (Alison Kelly (art historian), Oxford National Dictionary of Biography (ONDB)).) (Note: Alison Kelly (art historian) states on page 23 of Mrs Coade's Stone – "Since mother and daughter had the same name, confusion has reigned over the contribution of each of them to the manufactory. The widow Coade was of course Mrs, and it has been assumed that any mention of Mrs Coade must refer to her. Rupert Gunnis, for instance, believed that the widow ran the factory until her death in her late eighties, in 1796. What is not generally realised is that women in business, in Georgian times, had the courtesy title of Mrs so in the Coade records, it normally refers to Miss Coade. Bills were usually headed Eleanor Coade, but two, as early as 1771, for Hatfield Priory, Essex, and 1773, for work at Burton upon Trent Town Hall, were made out to Miss Coade, showing that from the early days she was in charge. The only references that specifically concern the mother are the first two entries for the factory in the Lambeth poor rate books, when the rate was paid by Widow Coade.") (Note: It appears that the modern identity confusion dates from 1951 (or earlier) when Sir Howard Roberts and Walter H. Godfrey published the Survey of London: volume 23 – Lambeth: South Bank and Vauxhall, and their confusion about the Coade family genealogy led to both gaps and false conclusions. Typically this state of knowledge was then reiterated by Rupert Gunnis in his 1953 Dictionary of British Sculptors, 1660–1851. More recently, the 'British History Online' website has given credence to the otherwise-excellent Roberts and Godfrey Survey of London, and some other internet sites have repeated the claims.) (Note: Her obituary notice was published in The Gentleman's Magazine, which declared her 'the sole inventor and proprietor of an art which deserves considerable notice'.) bought Daniel Pincot's struggling artificial stone business at Kings Arms Stairs, Narrow Wall, Lambeth, a site now under the Royal Festival Hall. This business developed into Coade's Artificial Stone Manufactory with Coade in charge, such that within two years (1771) she fired Pincot for "representing himself as the chief proprietor".

Coade did not invent artificial stone. Various lesser-quality ceramic precursors to Lithodipyra had been both patented and manufactured over the forty (or sixty) years prior to the introduction of her product. She was, however, probably responsible for perfecting both the clay recipe and the firing process. It is possible that Pincot's business was a continuation of that run nearby by Richard Holt, who had taken out two patents in 1722 for a kind of liquid metal or stone and another for making china without the use of clay, but there were many start-up artificial stone businesses in the early 18th century of which only Coade's succeeded.

The company did well and boasted an illustrious list of customers such as George III and members of the English nobility. (Note: Mrs. Coade sold to "a Debrett's full of English lords and Dukes.") In 1799, Coade appointed her cousin John Sealy (son of her mother's sister, Mary), already working as a modeller, as a partner in her business. The business then traded as Coade and Sealy until his death in 1813, when it reverted to Coade.

In 1799, she opened a showroom, Coade and Sealy's Gallery of Sculpture, on Pedlar's Acre at the Surrey end of Westminster Bridge Road, to display her products.(See Coade and Sealy gallery.)

In 1813, Coade took on William Croggan from Grampound in Cornwall, a sculptor and distant relative by marriage (second cousin once removed). He managed the factory until her death eight years later in 1821 whereupon he bought the factory from the executors for c. £4000. Croggan supplied a lot of Coade stone for Buckingham Palace; however, he went bankrupt in 1833 and died two years later. Trade declined, and production came to an end in the early 1840s.

== Material ==
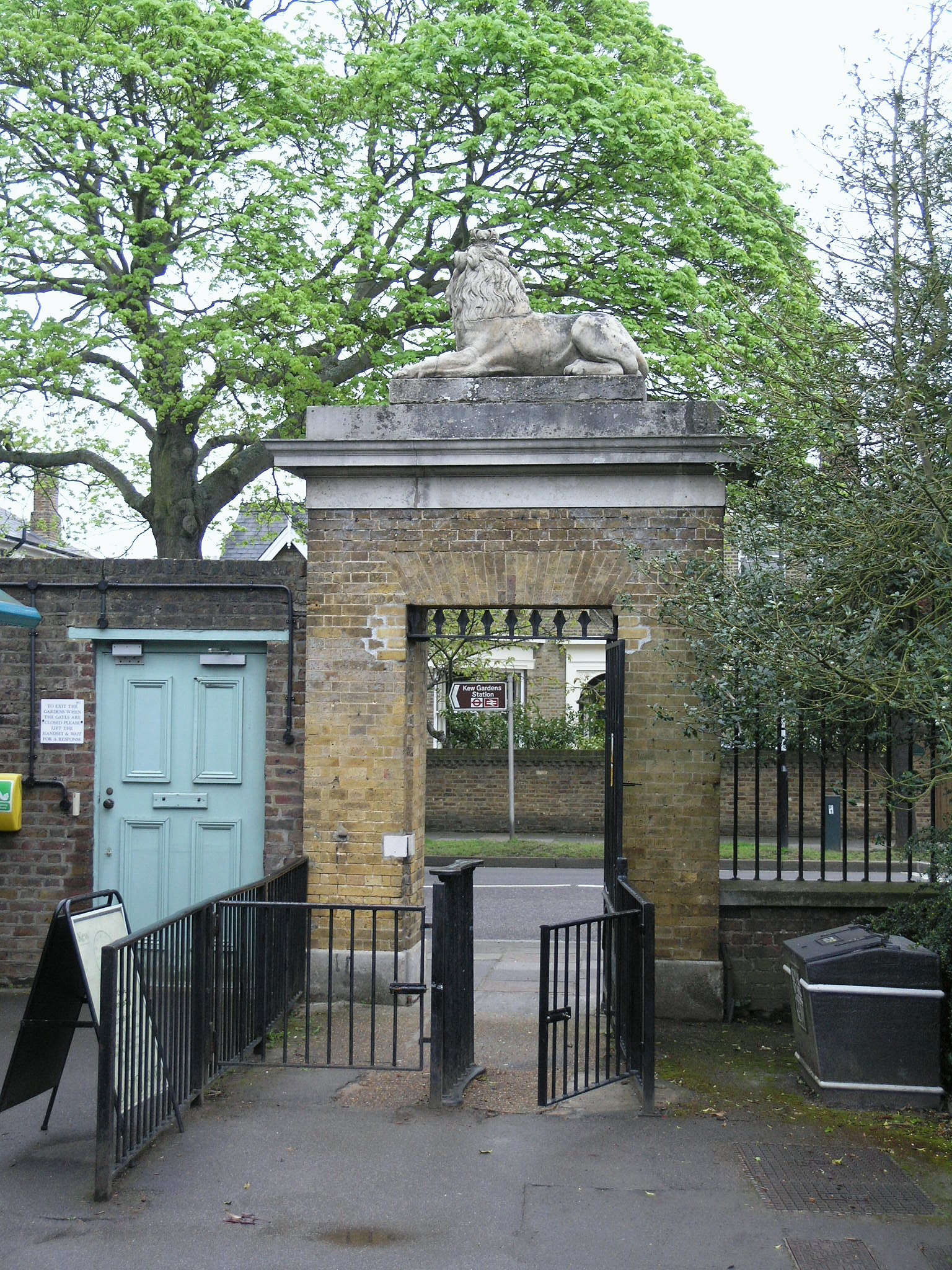
Lion Gate (above), an entrance into Kew Gardens, with its Coade stone lion statue on top. Coade stone unicorn statue (below) atop Unicorn Gate, another entrance.
(See § Examples: Kew Lion and Unicorn gates.)

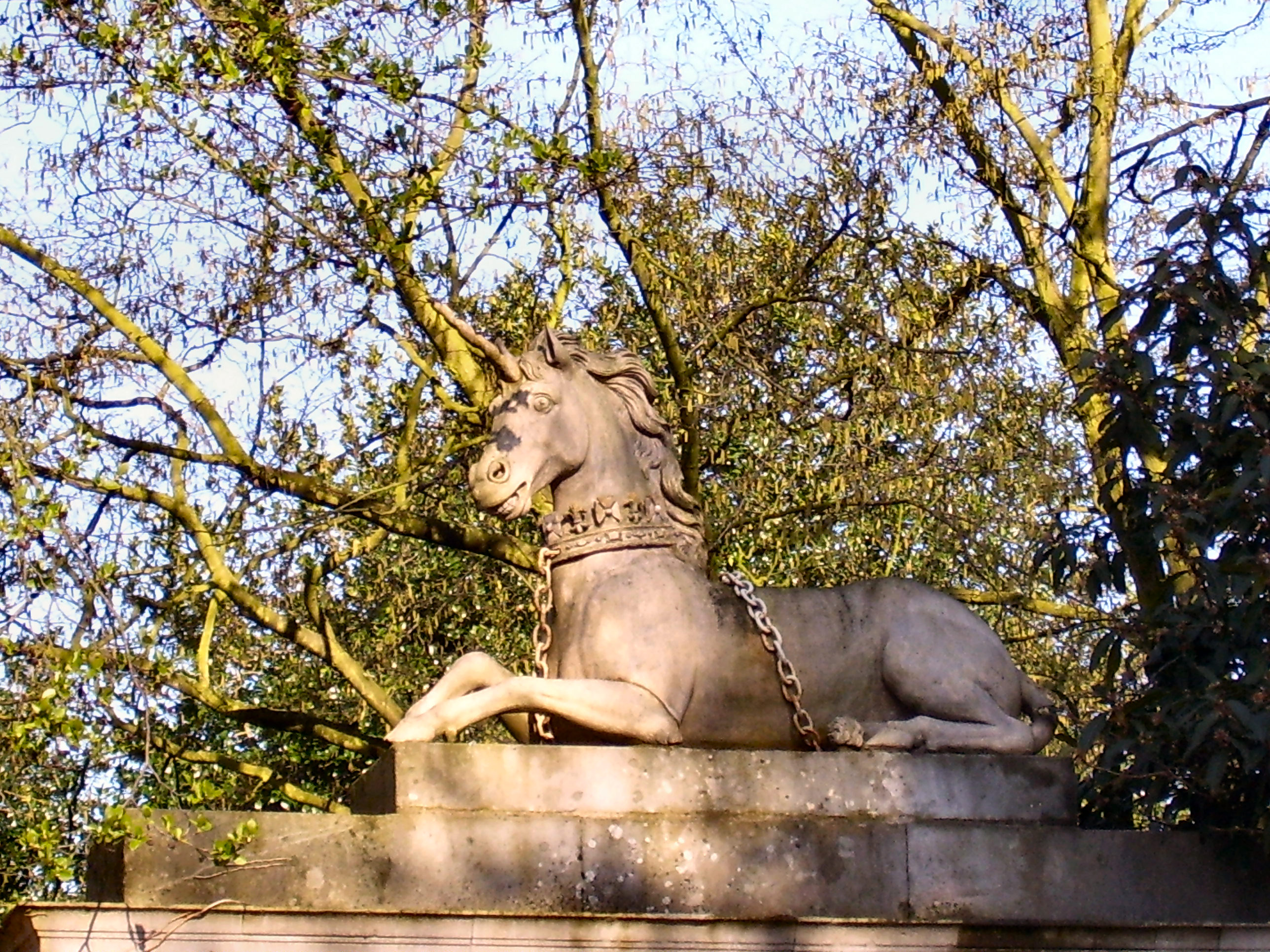

=== Description ===
Coade stone is a type of stoneware. Mrs Coade's own name for her products was Lithodipyra, a name constructed from ancient Greek words meaning 'stone-twice-fire' (λίθος/δίς/πυρά), or 'twice-fired stone'. Its colours varied from light grey to light yellow (or even beige) and its surface is best described as having a matte finish.

The ease with which the product could be moulded into complex shapes made it ideal for large statues, sculptures and sculptural façades. One-off commissions were expensive to produce, as they had to carry the entire cost of creating a mould. Whenever possible moulds were kept for many years of repeated use.

=== Formula ===
The recipe for Coade stone is claimed to be used today by Coade Ltd.

The manufacture of Coade stone required careful control and technique in kiln firing over a period of days, which was difficult to achieve with contemporary fuels and technology. Coade's factory was the only successful manufacturer.

The formula used was:

- 10% grog
- 5–10% crushed flint
- 5–10% fine quartz
- 10% crushed soda lime glass
- 60–70% ball clay from Dorset and Devon

This mixture was also referred to as "fortified clay", which was kneaded before insertion into a 1,100 °C (2,000 °F) kiln for firing over four days – a production technique very similar to brick manufacture.

Depending on the size and fineness of detail in the work, a different size and proportion of Coade grog was used. In many pieces a combination of grogs was used, with fine grogged clay applied to the surface for detail, backed up by a more heavily grogged mixture for strength.

=== Durability ===
One of the more striking features of Coade stone is its high resistance to weathering, with the material often faring better than most types of natural stone in London's harsh environment. Prominent examples listed below have survived without apparent wear and tear for 150 years. There were, however, notable exceptions. (Note: Three sources describe Rossi's statue of George IV erected in the Royal Crescent, Brighton as "unable to withstand the weathering effects of sea-spray and strong wind: such that, by 1807 the fingers on the sculpture's left hand had been destroyed, and soon afterwards the whole right arm dropped off." By contrast however Fashionable Brighton, 1820–1860 by Antony Dale (online) describes similar damage as 'wore badly' but does not attribute 'broken fingers, nose, mantle and arm on an unloved statue' to weathering or poor quality Coade stone. In 1819, after considerable complaints, the relic was removed and its present state is undocumented.) A few works produced by Coade, mainly dating from the later period, have shown poor resistance to weathering due to a bad firing in the kiln, where the material was not brought up to a sufficient temperature.

=== Demise ===
Coade stone was only superseded after Mrs Coade's death in 1821, by cast stone products using naturally exothermic Portland cement as a binder. It appears to have been largely phased out by the 1840s.

== Examples ==
Over 650 pieces are still in existence worldwide.

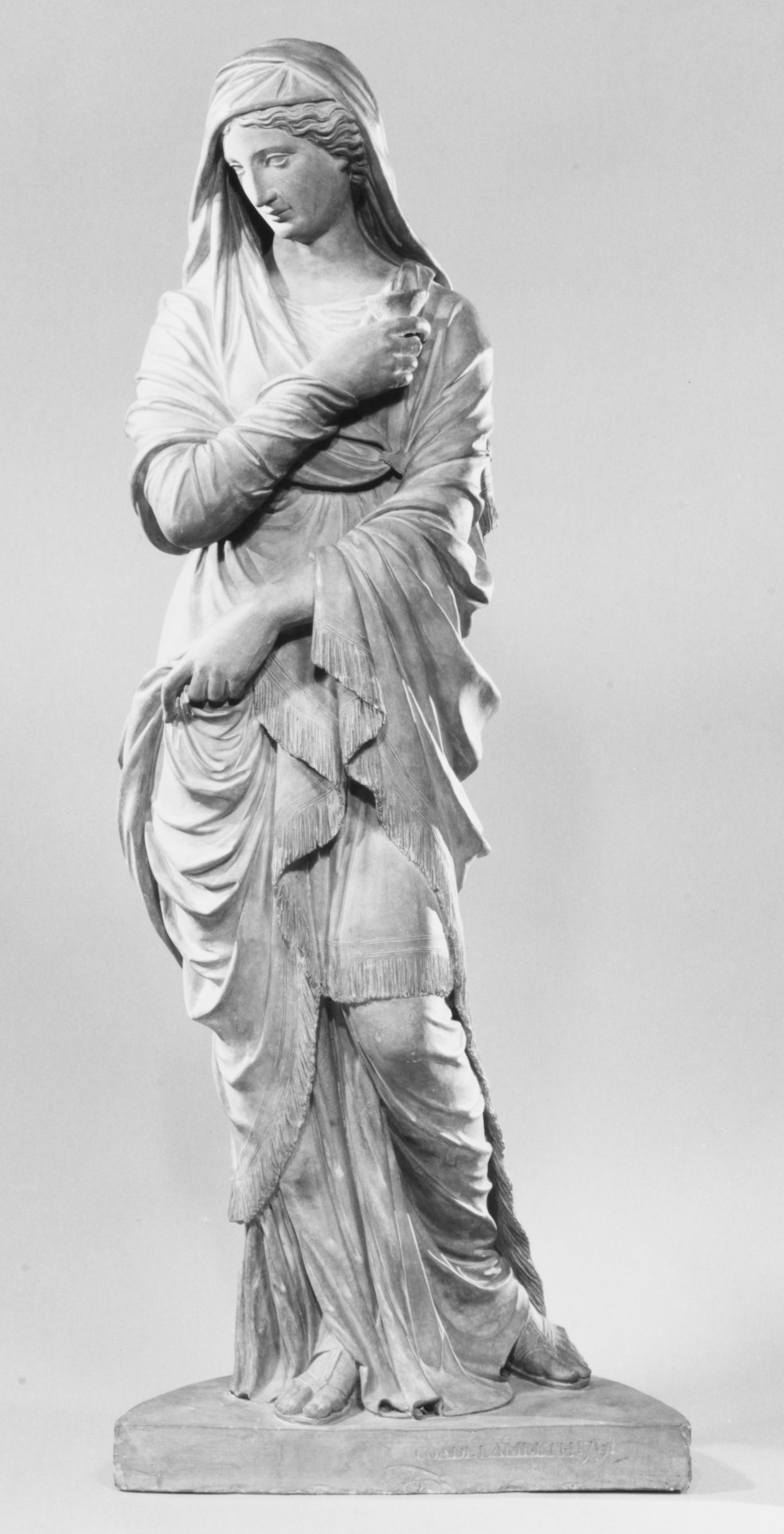
Metropolitan Museum of Art The Met – New York City Faith – 'Overpainted Coade stone' by John Bacon the Elder, 1791 ''(See § Examples: Metropolitan Museum.)

- Apsley House, No. 1, London. Duke of Wellington's house. The 1819 renovations by architect Benjamin Dean Wyatt included Scagliola ornamentation (that resembles marble inlays) in Coade stone. (51°30′12″N 0°09′05″W)
- Athenry Abbey, Ireland, The last de Bermingham to be buried at Athenry was Lady Mathilda Bermingham (d. 1788). The tower collapsed around 1790. Lady Mathilda's tomb, a Coade stone monument, was broken into in 2002. (53.298236°N 8.744544°W)
- Banff, Aberdeenshire, Scotland. Duff House Mausoleum, Wrack Woods. James Duff, 2nd Earl Fife built the mausoleum for his family in 1791, possibly on the site of a Carmelite friary. Built before the Gothic Revival, this is an example of "Gothick" architecture. Typically Georgian – the carvings, including the monument to the first Earl, are in Coade stone. (57.654185°N 2.537119°W)
- Bargate, a Grade I listed medieval gatehouse in the city centre of Southampton. In 1809 a Coade stone statue of George III in Roman dress was added the middle of the four windows of the southern side. It was a gift to the town from John Petty, 2nd Marquess of Lansdowne. (50°54′10″N 1°24′15″W)
- Bath, 8 Argyll Street – The Royal Arms of Queen Charlotte are above the entrance to A.H.Hale, (Pharmacy) established 1826.(51.383375°N 2.356795°W)
- Battersea, St Mary's Church The church includes several important monuments from the earlier church. John Camden, (d. 1780), and his eldest daughter Elizabeth Neild, (d. 1791). 'Girl by a funeral urn with a poetic eulogy'. Signed by Coade of Lambeth (1792).(51°28′36″N 0°10′32″W)
- Becconsall Old Church, Hesketh Bank, Lancashire. The baptismal font, dating from the 18th century, is the form of a vase, and is made from Coade stone.(53.7025°N 2.8312°W)
- Birmingham Botanical Gardens, England. A Coade stone fountain lies west of the bandstand, which was presented in 1850 and was designed by the Birmingham architect, Charles Edge.(52°27′59″N 1°55′45″W)
- Birmingham Library, displayed in the Library are two large Coade stone medallions, made in the 1770s and removed from the front of the city's Theatre Royal when it was demolished in 1956. These depict David Garrick and William Shakespeare.(52°28′47″N 1°54′30″W)
- Brighton, Royal Pavilion of King George IV.(50.822397°N 0.137835°W)
- Brighton and Hove Cemetery. Anna Maria Crouch, actress, singer and mistress of George IV, has an elaborate, Grade II-listed, Coade stone table tomb with a carved memorial tablet, friezes with foliage patterns and Vitruvian scrolls, putti and a Classical-style urn.(50°49′42″N 0°08′22″W)

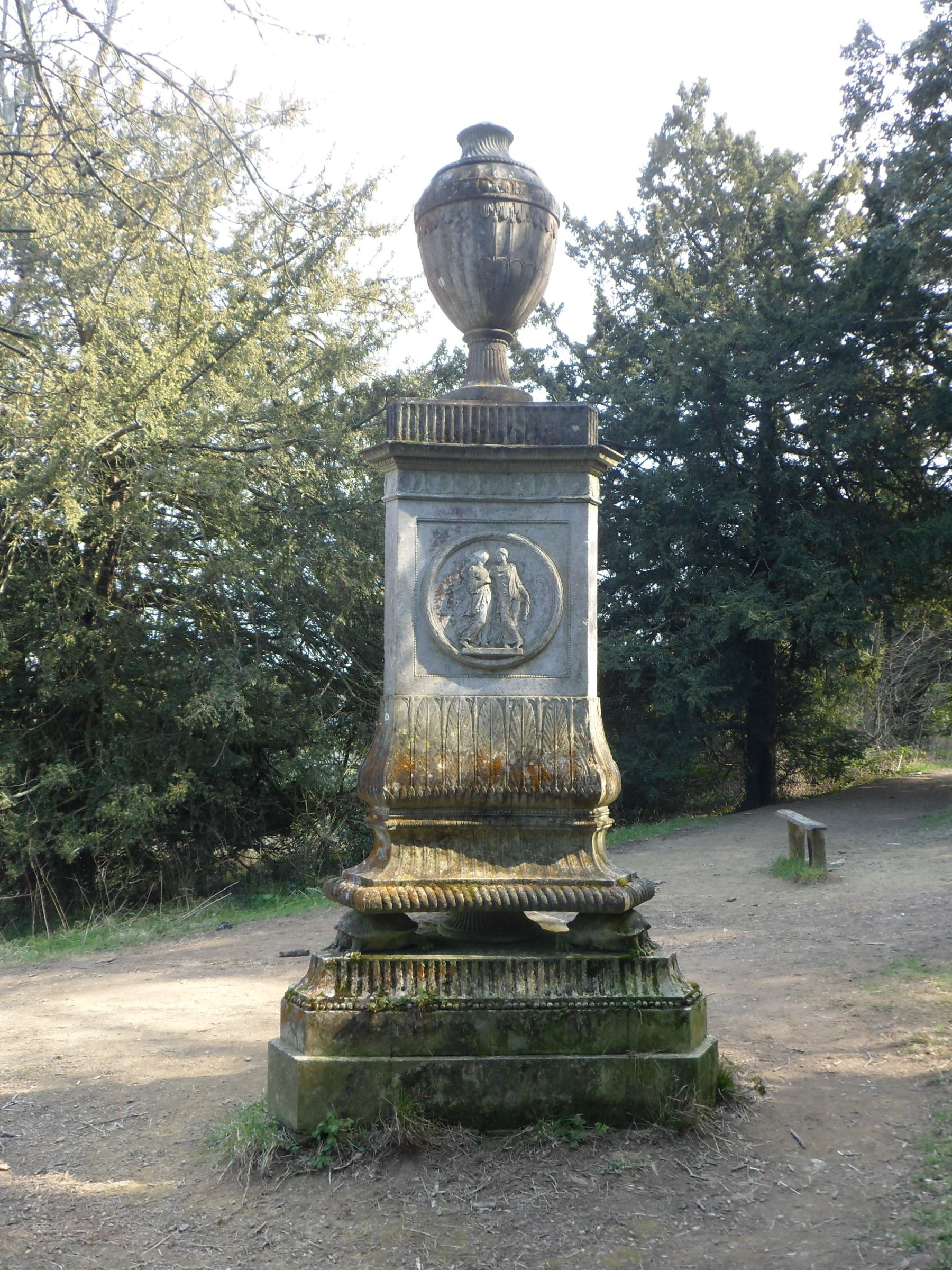
Frankland Monument, Stanmer Park, Brighton

- Brighton, Stanmer Park, Sussex. Frankland Monument. A Coade stone statue of 1775 by Richard Hayward, erected to commemorate Frederick Meinhardt Frankland (c. 1694–1768), barrister-at-law, MP for Thirsk, son of Sir Thomas Frankland, 2nd Baronet). Listed at Grade II by English Heritage (NHLE Code 1380952). It was erected at the expense of Thomas Pelham, 1st Earl of Chichester, who owned Stanmer House and the estate, and his wife Ann, who was Frankland's daughter. The plinth has three stone tortoises and a Latin inscription. The triangular column above has concave sides with oval panels and a cornice with a frieze and some egg-and-dart moulding, all topped by an urn. The monument stands on top of a hill in Stanmer Park.(50.8667°N 0.1025°W)
- Brogyntyn, near Oswestry, Shropshire. Benjamin Gummow designed a portico and other alterations for the Ormsby Gores, 1814–15. He used Coade stone ornamentation on the interior of the portico(52.8729°N 3.0723°W)
- Broomhall House, Dunfermline, Scotland. A 1796 redesign by Thomas Harrison included a semi-circular bay on the south front decorated with three Coade stone panels depicting reclining figures. 56.03715°N 3.48325°W
- Buckingham Palace London, (in a section not open to the public). A frieze with vegetative scrollwork of Coade stone, balconies accessible from the first floor, and an attic with figural sculptures based on the Elgin Marbles. The west front overlooking the main garden features large Classical urns made of Coade stone. (51°30′3″N 0°8′31″W)
- Burnham Thorpe – Nelson's Memorial.(52.936°N 0.760°E)
- Burton Constable Hall in the East Riding of Yorkshire, displays 3 figures and a number of 'medallions' above the doors and windows of the Orangerie. In 1966 this was designated as Grade II*. (53.813740°N 0.196000°W)
- Capesthorne Hall, Cheshire. The Drawing Room features twin fireplaces made from Coade stone, dated to 1789, which originally belonged to the family's house in Belgravia, London. Both are carved, one depicting Faith, Hope and Charity, and the other the Aldobrandini Marriage.(53.2524°N 2.2397°W)
- Carlton House, London.(51.506138°N 0.131672°W)
- Castle Howard, North Yorkshire, (54.121464°N 0.905812°W)
- Charborough House, Dorset. The park wall, alongside the A31 is punctuated by Stag Gate at the northern extremity and Lion Lodge at the easternmost entrance, with heraldic symbols in Coade stone. These gateways are Grade II listed, as is a third one, East Almer Lodge, further to the west. A fourth gateway, Peacock Lodge, is inside the estate, is Grade II* listed.(50°46′50″N 2°06′24″W)
- Chelmsford Cathedral, Essex. The nave partially collapsed in 1800, and was rebuilt by the County architect John Johnson, retaining the Perpendicular design, but using Coade stone piers and tracery, and a plaster ceiling.(51.7355°N 0.4741°E)
- Chichester – The Buttermarket. Designed by John Nash (coat of arms engraved with "Coade & Sealey 1808")(50.837477°N 0.778947°W)
- Chiswick High Road, London, Presbytery of brown brick with Coade stone details, three storeys with double-hung sash windows; Grade II listed.(51°29′32″N 0°15′40″W)
- Chiswick House, London. A couple of large ornate urns in the Italian Garden.(51.483611°N 0.258611°W)
- Clerkenwell, St James's Church Over the west door are the royal arms of George III. Made of Coade stone and dated 1792, they were formerly over the reredos.(51.5236°N 0.1056°W)

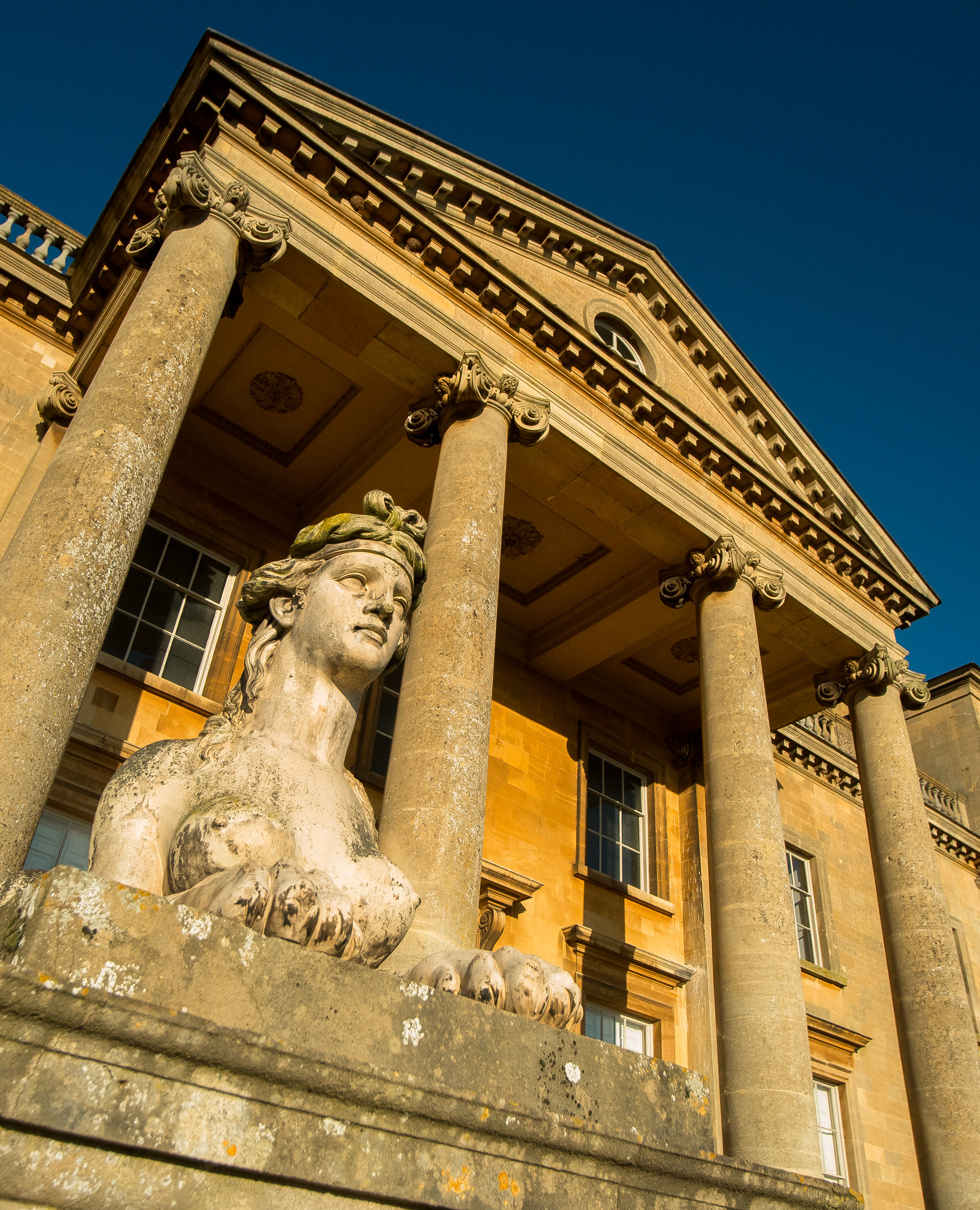
Croome Court, Upton-upon-Severn. South staircase guarded by two Coade stone sphinxes.

- Cottesbrooke, Northamptonshire. 'All Saints Church' contains a free-standing monument to Sir William Langham, (d.1812) in the nave, moulded in Coade stone by Bacon Junior.(52.3551°N 0.9663°W)
- Croome Court, Upton-upon-Severn in Worcestershire. The south face has a broad staircase, with Coade stone sphinxes on each side, leading to a south door topped with a cornice on consoles. (52.0996°N 2.1694°W)

- Culzean Castle, overlooking the Firth of Clyde, near Maybole, Scotland. The former home of the Marquess of Ailsa. "Cat Gates" – The original inner entrance with Coade stone cats (restored in 1995) surmounting the pillars. The lodge cottages were demolished in the 1950s.(55.354400°N 4.789500°W), (See § Examples: Cat gates at Culzean Castle.)

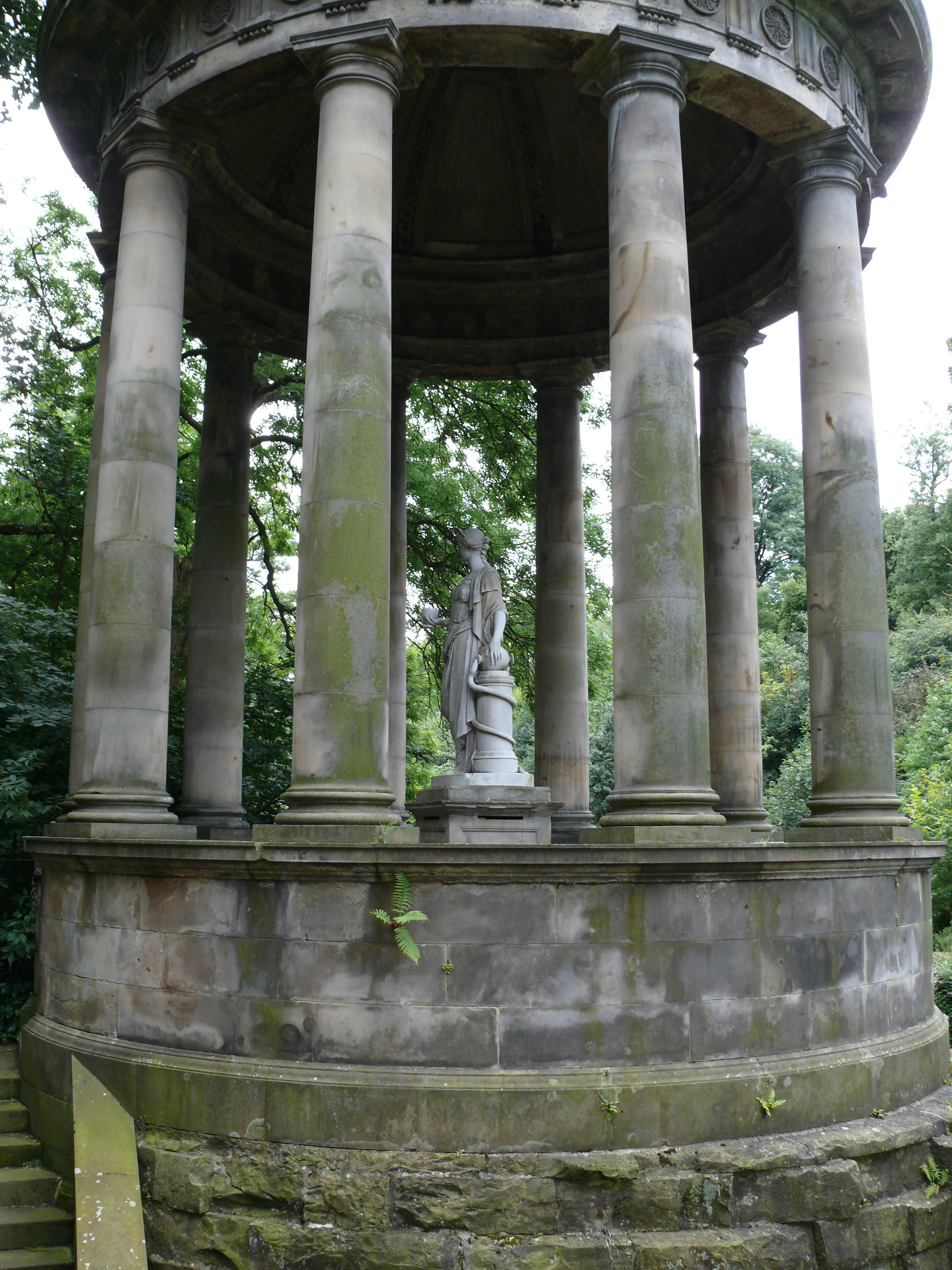
"Statue of Hygieia", St Bernard's Well, by the Water of Leith, Edinburgh

- Daylesford House, Gloucestershire. The main front was originally to the west, at the centre of which is a projecting semicircular bay, with four Ionic pillars and French Neoclassical garland swags around the architrave, topped by a shallow dome with pointed Coade stone finial, and wings projecting to either side. (51°56′10″N 1°37′54″W)
- Doddington Hall, Cheshire, The country house was designed by Samuel Wyatt. An outer double staircase leads up to a doorway flanked by columns and under a blind arch containing a Coade stone medallion containing a sign of the Zodiac. There are similar medallions over the first floor windows in the outer bays.(53.0148°N 2.4342°W)
- Edinburgh, Stockbridge The "Statue of Hygieia" in the St Bernard's Well building by the Water of Leith "is made of coade stone".(55.979399°N 3.170638°W). (See additional image in § Gallery.)
- Edinburgh, Bonaly Tower. Statue of William Shakespeare in Coade stone. (55.895956°N 3.257439°W)
- Egyptian House, Penzance, Cornwall. There is some dispute over the architect and the date of build, but in 1973, it was acquired by the Landmark Trust, the elaborate mouldings were mainly Coade stone.(50.11788°N 5.53637°W)
- Exeter, 'Palace Gate' – Coade stone doorways on the terrace in 'Palace Gate' between the cathedral and South Street. Several late 18th century houses near Exeter Cathedral have doorway surrounds decorated with a keystone face (chosen from a small range of moulds), and decorative blocks.(50.721310°N 3.530000°W)

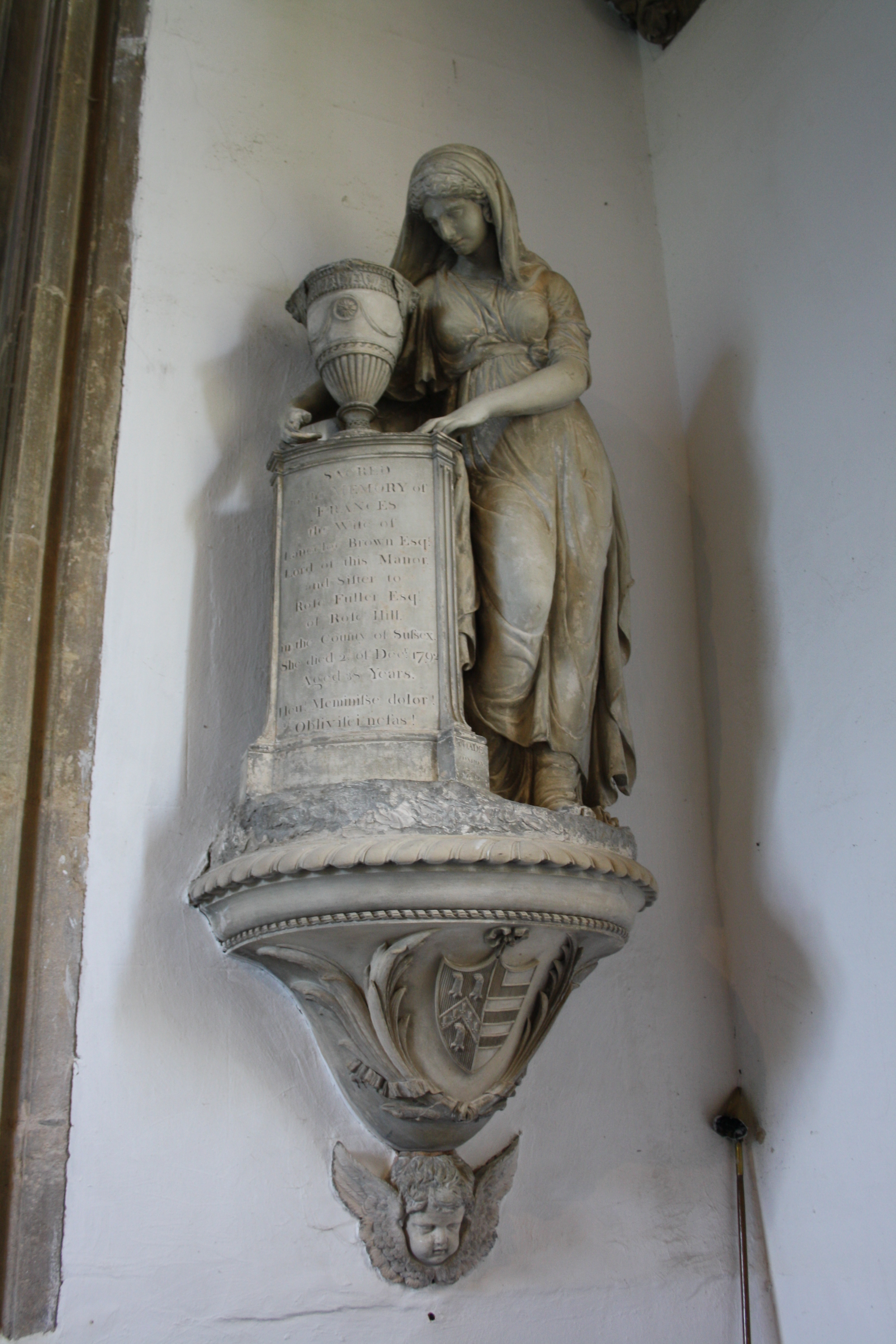
Memorial to Frances Brown, daughter in law of Lancelot "Capability" Brown (Fenstanton)

- Fenstanton, Cambridgeshire, Church of St Peter and St Paul, Memorial to Frances Brown, daughter in law of Lancelot "Capability" Brown in Coade stone. (52.3°N 0.07°W). (See adjacent image at right.)
- Great Yarmouth, Britannia Monument Coade stone caryatids replaced by concrete copies.(52.5884°N 1.7336°E)

- Greenwich, Royal Naval College – Admiral Lord Nelson's Pediment in the King William Courtyard of the Old Royal Naval College was regarded by the Coade workers as the finest of all their work. It was sculpted by Joseph Panzetta in 1813, as a public memorial after his death at the Battle of Trafalgar in 1805. It was based on a painting by Benjamin West depicting Nelson's body being offered to Britannia by a Winged Victory. It was cleaned in 2016. (51.483278°N 0.005564°W), (See § Examples: Nelson Pediment.)
- Grey Coat Hospital Westminster. The 1707 Acts of Union with Scotland arms of Queen Anne, with her 1702 motto semper eadem ("always the same"), executed in Coade stone. (51.4960°N 0.1343°W)
- Haberdashers' Hatcham College, Telegraph Hill, Lewisham. A Coade stone statue of Robert Aske stands in the forecourt of the college, formerly Haberdashers' Aske's Hatcham Boys' School, in Pepys Road. It dates from 1836 and shows him in the robes of the Haberdashers' Company, leaning on a plinth and holding in his hand the plans of the school built at that time in Hoxton, whence the statue was transferred in 1903.(51.4679°N 0.0433°W)

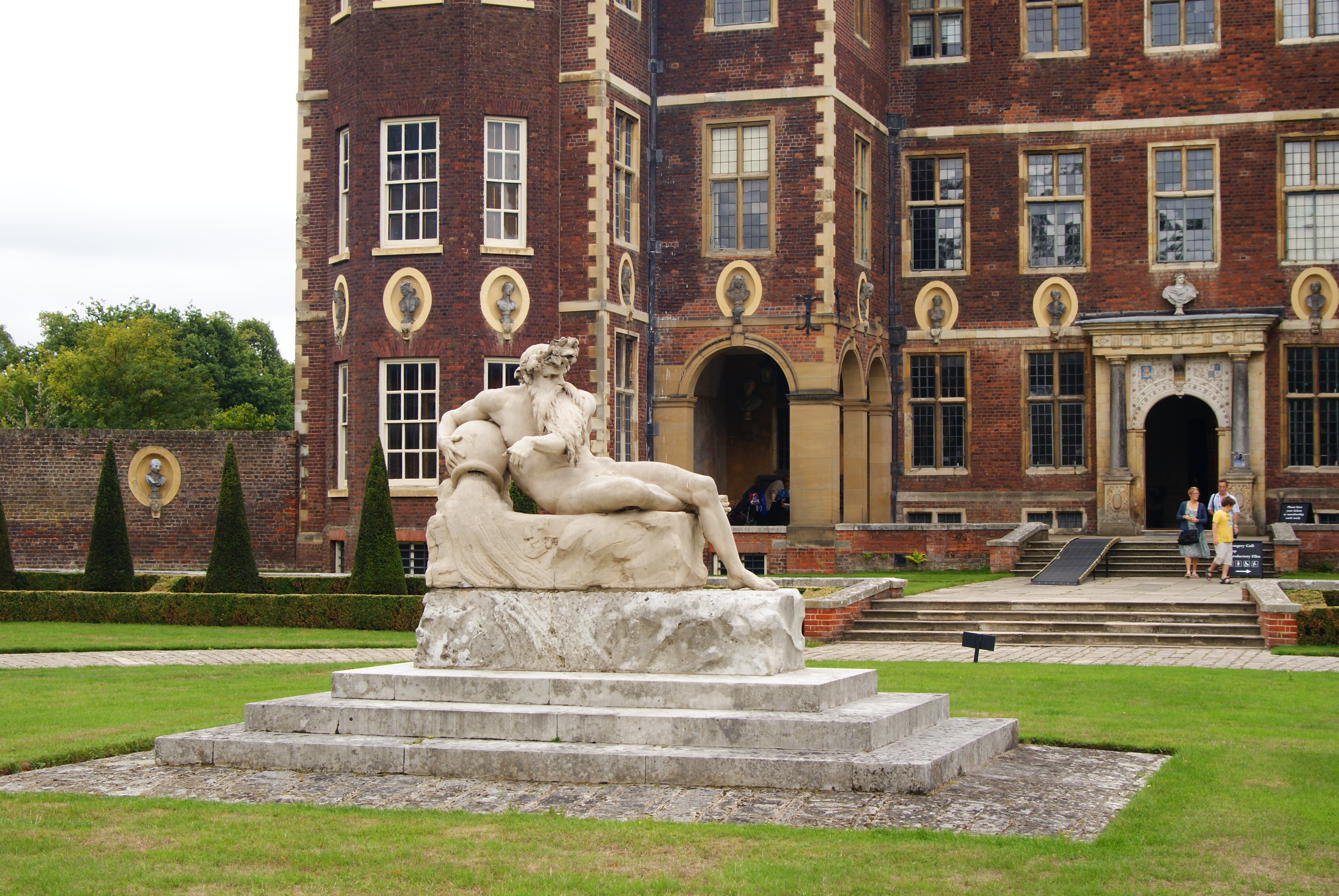
Father Thames, by John Bacon, in the grounds of Ham House

- Ham House Richmond, on the River Thames near London, has a reclining statue of Father Thames, by John Bacon in the entrance courtyard.
- Haldon Belvedere, Devon. Inside is a larger-than-life-size Coade stone statue of General Stringer Lawrence dressed as a Roman general; a copy of the marble statue of him by Peter Scheemakers (1691–1781).50°39′51″N 3°35′34″W
- Hammerwood Park, East Grinstead. Coade stone plaques of scenes derived from the Borghese Vase adorn both porticos.(51.1312°N 0.0595°E)

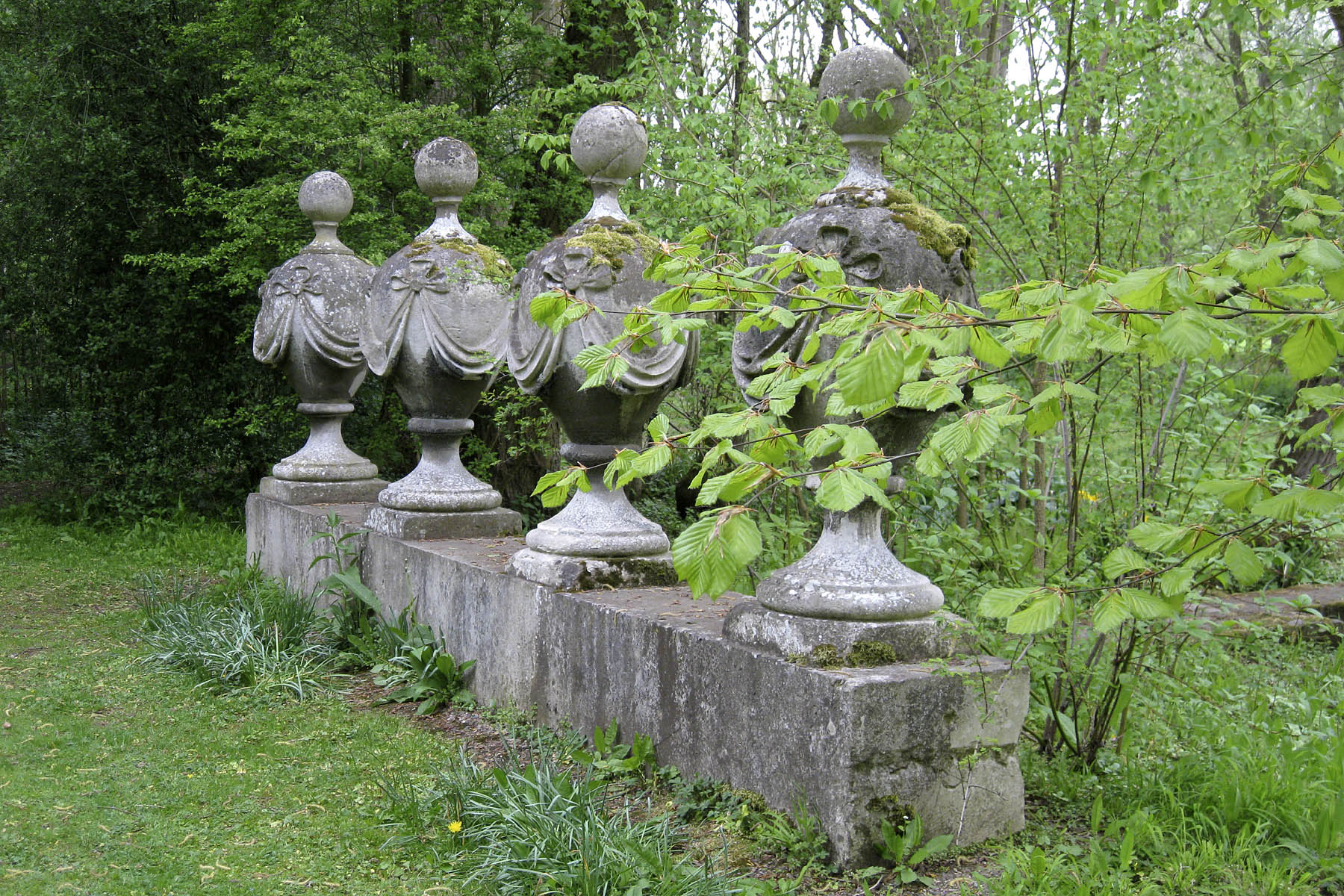
The Gibberd Garden, Harlow, Essex, created by Sir Frederick Gibberd

- Harlow, Essex, The Gibberd Garden Coade stone urns originally from Coutts Bank, The Strand, now in the garden created by Sir Frederick Gibberd who died in 1984.(51.791698°N 0.149874°E)
- Heaton Hall, A country house that was remodelled between 1772 and 1789 by James Wyatt. Further additions were made in 1823 by Lewis Wyatt. It is built in sandstone with dressings in Coade stone and is in Palladian style. (53.53622°N 2.25296°W)

- Herstmonceux Place East Sussex. Circa 1932 it ceased to be a private house and was divided into flats. The north front of the house was built in the late 17th century. The south and east fronts were designed by Samuel Wyatt in 1778. The white panels are made of Coade Stone. (50.8759°N 0.3288°E), (See § Gallery: Herstmonceux Place.)

- Highclere Castle, Hampshire. 'London Lodge' (1793), Brick but Coade stone dressed, and wings (1840).(51.340650°N 1.342786°W), (See § Gallery: Highclere Castle, London Lodge.)
- Horniman Museum, Forest Hill, London. The facade of the Pelican and British Empire Life Insurance Company at 70 Lombard Street in the City of London was rescued before demolition in 1915 and is now displayed in the museum. To adorn its building, Pelican added an allegorical sculptural group to the previously plain facade; the group was designed by Lady Diana Beauclerk and sculpted by John de Veere of the Coade factory. (51°26′26″N 0°03′39″W)
- Ifield, West Sussex – St Margaret's Church, There are several other large tombs from the 18th century in the churchyard—some of which are good examples of Coade stone. The George Hutchinson wall memorial in the chancel, designed by local sculptor Richard Joanes, includes Coade stone embellishments. (51°7′26″N 0°13′10″W)

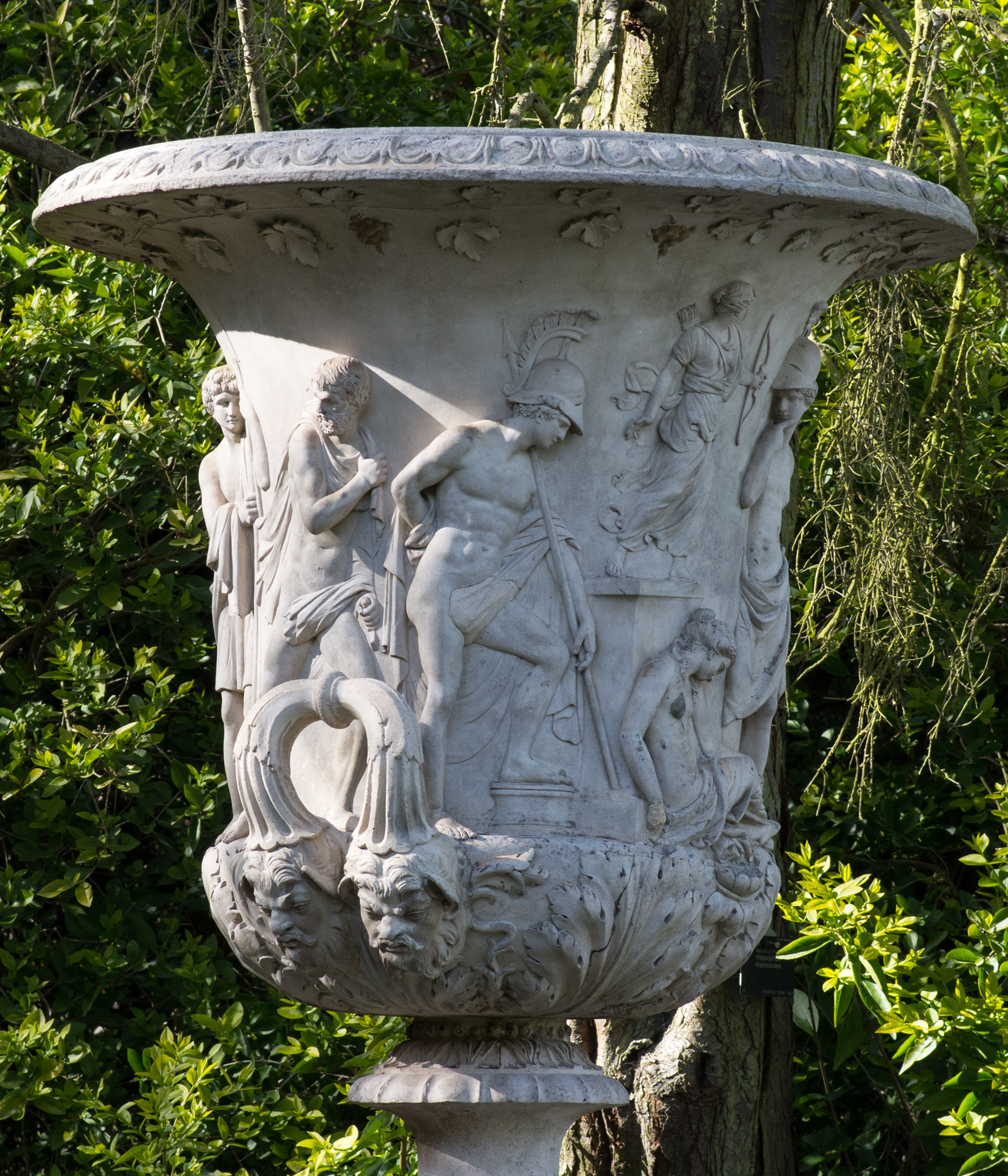
The Medici Vase, Kew Gardens, from a pair ordered by George IV

- Imperial War Museum, London. Sculptural reliefs above the entrance.(51.495994°N 0.108606°W)

- Kensington Palace, Kensington High Street, London. The lion and unicorn statues on pillars at the entrance to Kensington Palace.(51.502436°N 0.187594°W), (See § Gallery: Lion and Unicorn gate.)

- Kew Gardens – The lion and unicorn statues over their respective gates into The Royal Botanical Gardens.(Lion Gate-51.470595°N 0.293594°W)(Unicorn Gate-51.477088°N 0.290914°W), (See § Material: Kew Lion and Unicorn gates.)
- Kew Gardens, The Medici Vase, from a pair ordered by George IV.
- Lancaster Castle, Shire Hall and Crown Court were completed by 1798 by Thomas Harrison (architect). Six Gothic columns support a panelled vault covering the main part of the courtroom. Around the perimeter is an arcade, and the judge's bench has an elaborate canopy in Coade stone.(54.04981°N 2.80562°W)
- Lancaster, Royal Lancaster Infirmary. The hospital by Paley, Austin and Paley is in free Renaissance style, and built in sandstone with slate roofs. It has an octagonal entrance tower that is flanked by wings. The tower has four stages, and above the entrance is a niche containing a Coade stone statue of the Good Samaritan. (54.04424°N 2.79932°W)

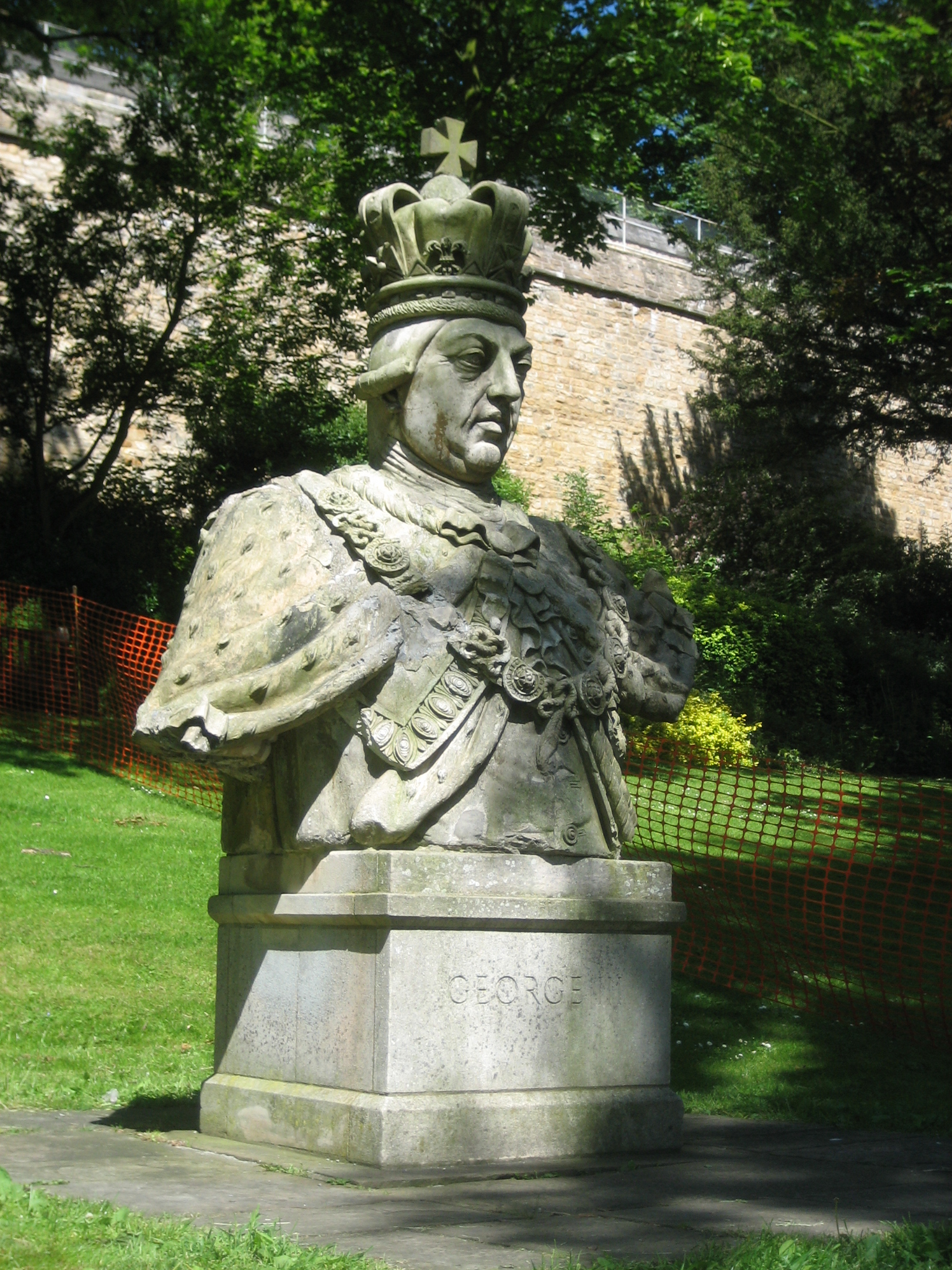
George III at Lincoln Castle

- Lawhitton, Cornwall. The parish church of St Michael includes two monuments, to R. Bennet (d. 1683) and in Coade stone to Richard Bennet-Coffin (d. 1796). (50.617°N 4.326°W)
- Lea Marston, Warwickshire. The Church Saint John the Baptist contains numerous monuments to members of the Adderley family, including one from 1784 made of Coade stone. (52.538°N 1.702°W)
- Leicester. The City Rooms (formerly The County Rooms), Hotel Street. Architect: John Johnson. Two decorative friezes 'The Borghese Dancers', capitals to tripartate windows, ballusters, small paterae and small faces in corners.
- Leicester. 'Two Charity Children' by John Bacon. Originally a gift to St. Mary's Charity School in 1786, "erected at the joint expense of John Johnson and John Horton [of] London: both natives of Leicester." Since the school closed the figures have been moved to several locations. Now at St. John the Baptist Primary School, Clarendon Park.
- Lewes, Lewes Crown Court. Located at the highest point of the old town is the Portland stone and Coade stone facade of the Crown Court (1808–12, by John Johnson).(50.8730°N 0.0096°E)
- Lincoln Castle, Coade stone bust of George III, relocated from atop the Dunston Pillar in 1940. (53.23529°N 0.54095°W)
- Liverpool. George Bullock (sculptor) statue of Horatio Nelson, 1st Viscount Nelson in Coade stone. (Location unclear) (53°24′27″N 02°59′31″W)

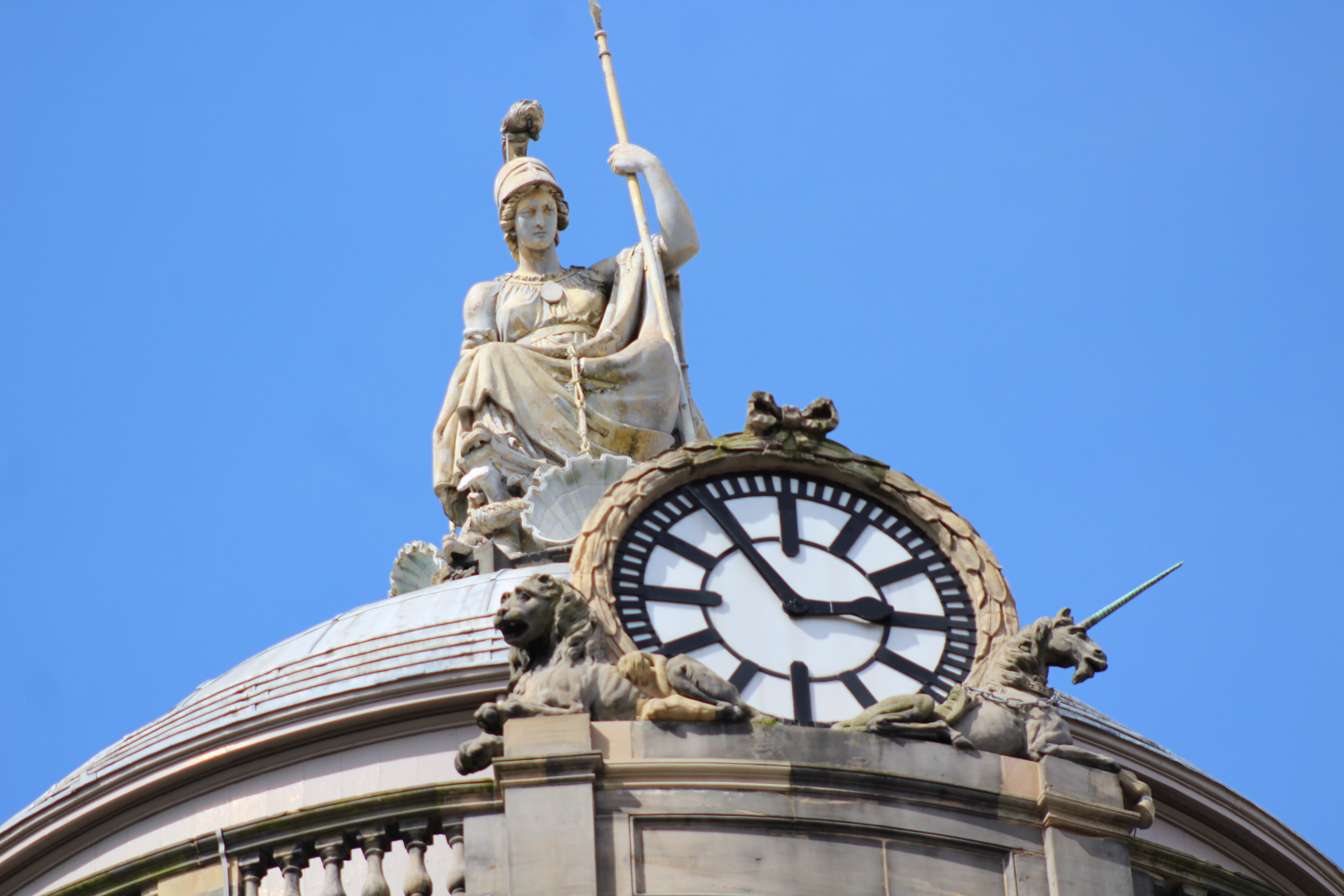
1802 statue by Charles Rossi – Britannia or Minerva atop Liverpool Town Hall (See § Examples: Liverpool Town Hall.)

- Liverpool Town Hall. 1802 statue by Charles Rossi – Britannia or Minerva atop Liverpool Town Hall. Minerva, the goddess of wisdom, or Britannia. She is holding a spear, which is a common replacement for Britannia's trident, but that is usually in her right hand. Minerva is commonly depicted with an owl, but she is also the goddess of strategic warfare, so a spear makes sense. Both wear Corinthian helmets. Who is it? – Neither Rossi's own list of commissions, nor a (non-existent) Royal Academy contemporary list of his worksare available, so both Historic England and Pevsner hedge their bets saying "Britannia or Minerva".

- Lurgan, Northern Ireland. 42–46 High Street. Decorative stonework with Coade stone keys and sculpted heads.(54.4607737°N 6.328979°W) Provenance unclear.

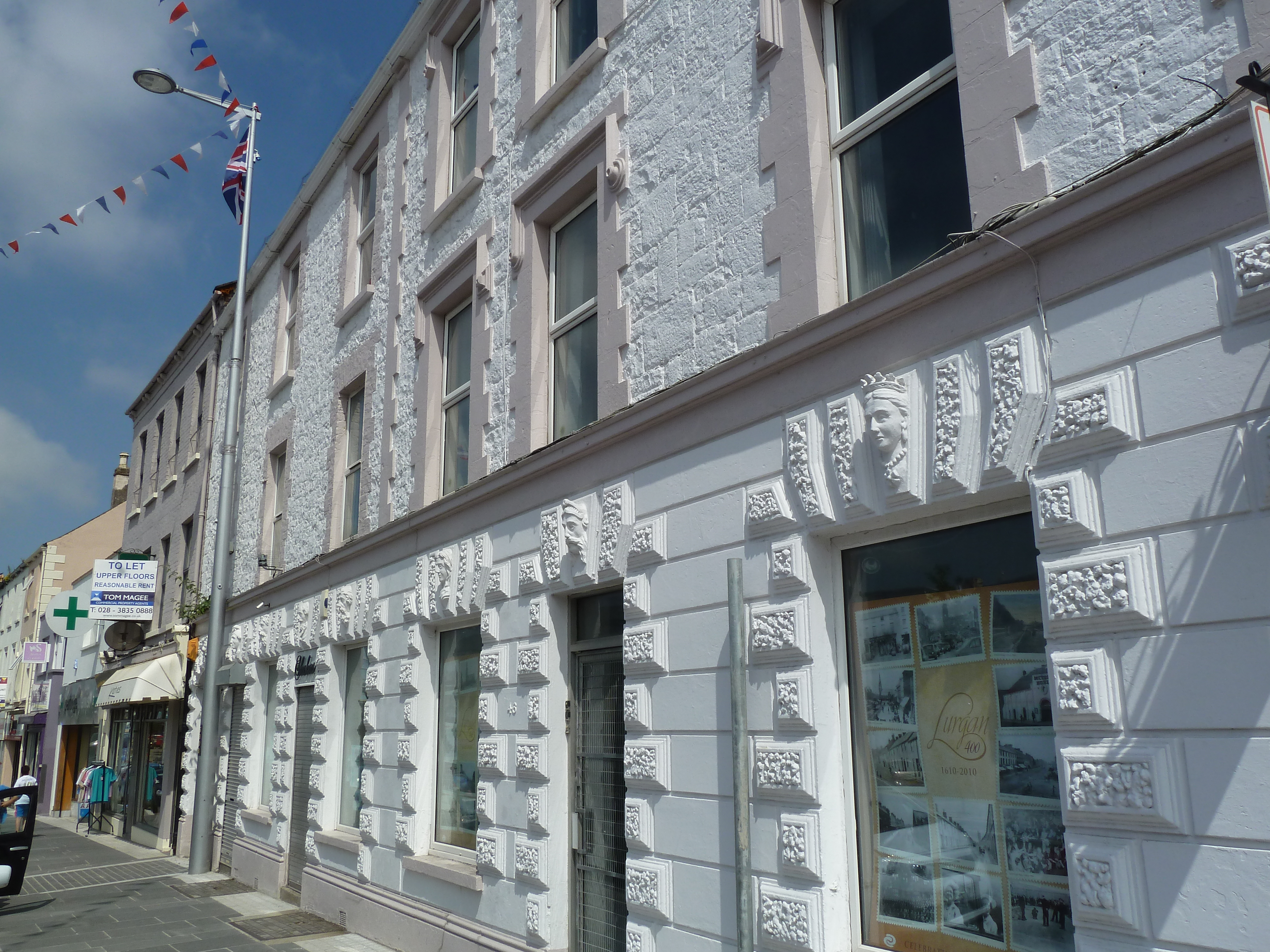
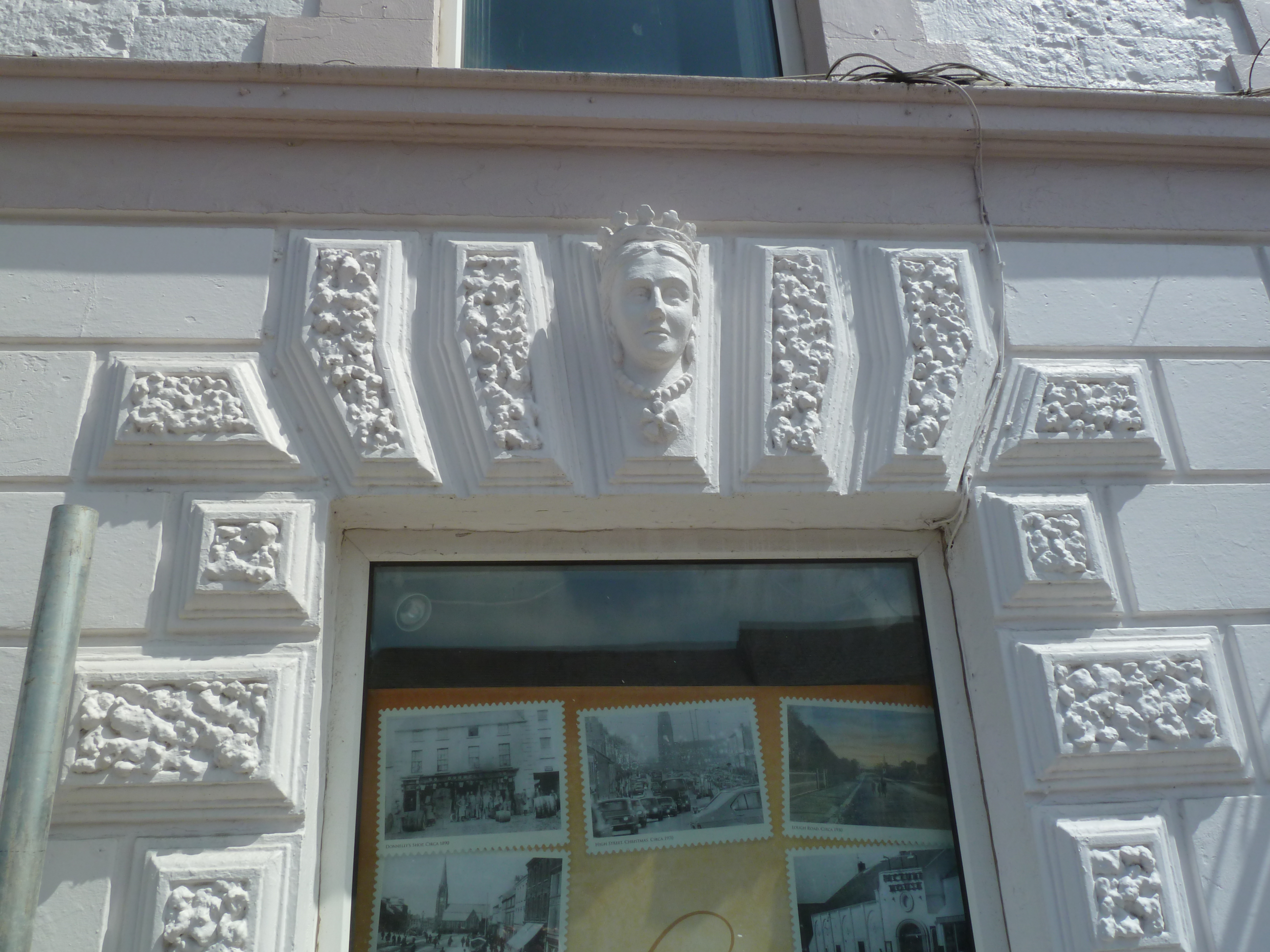
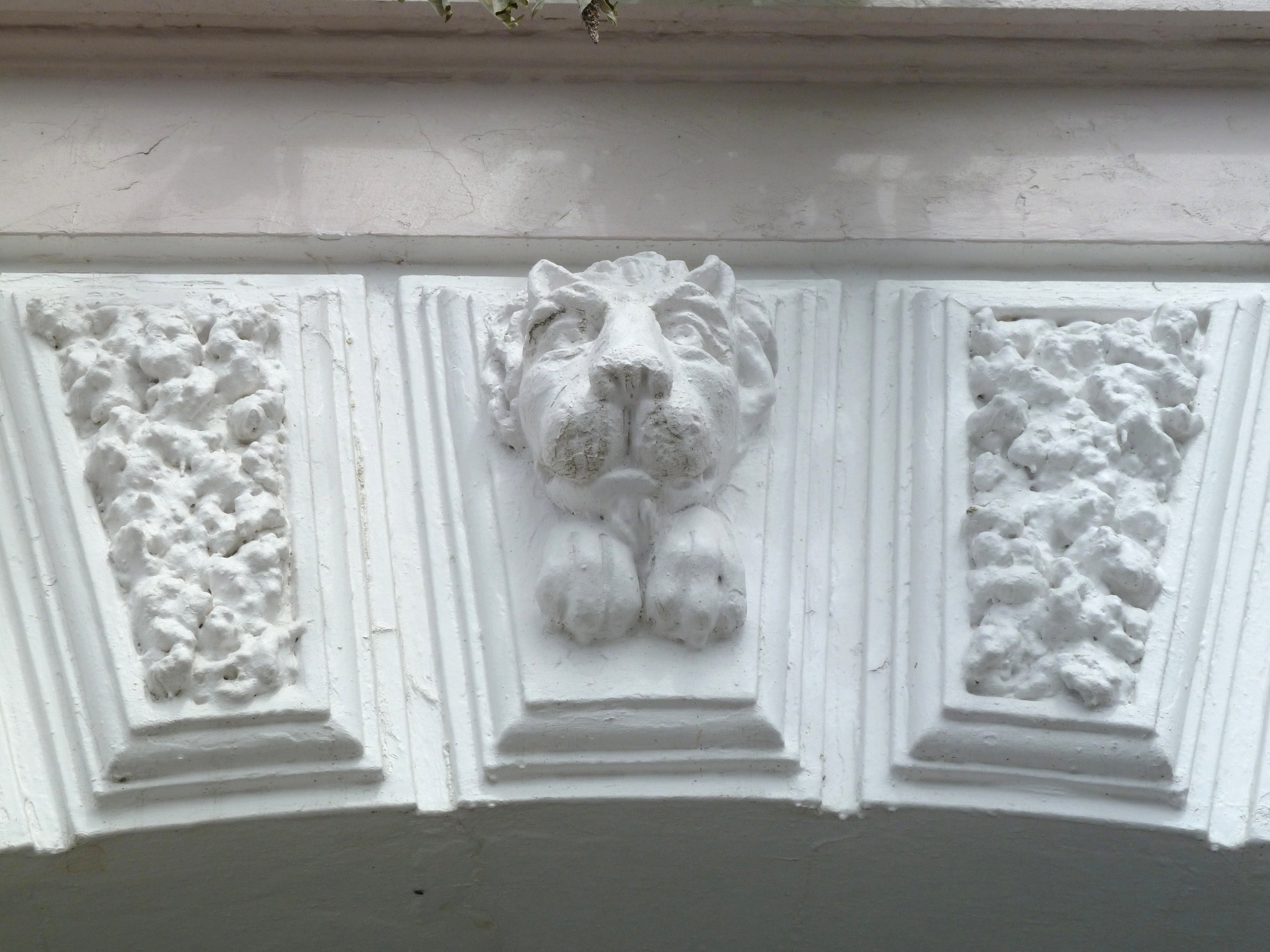
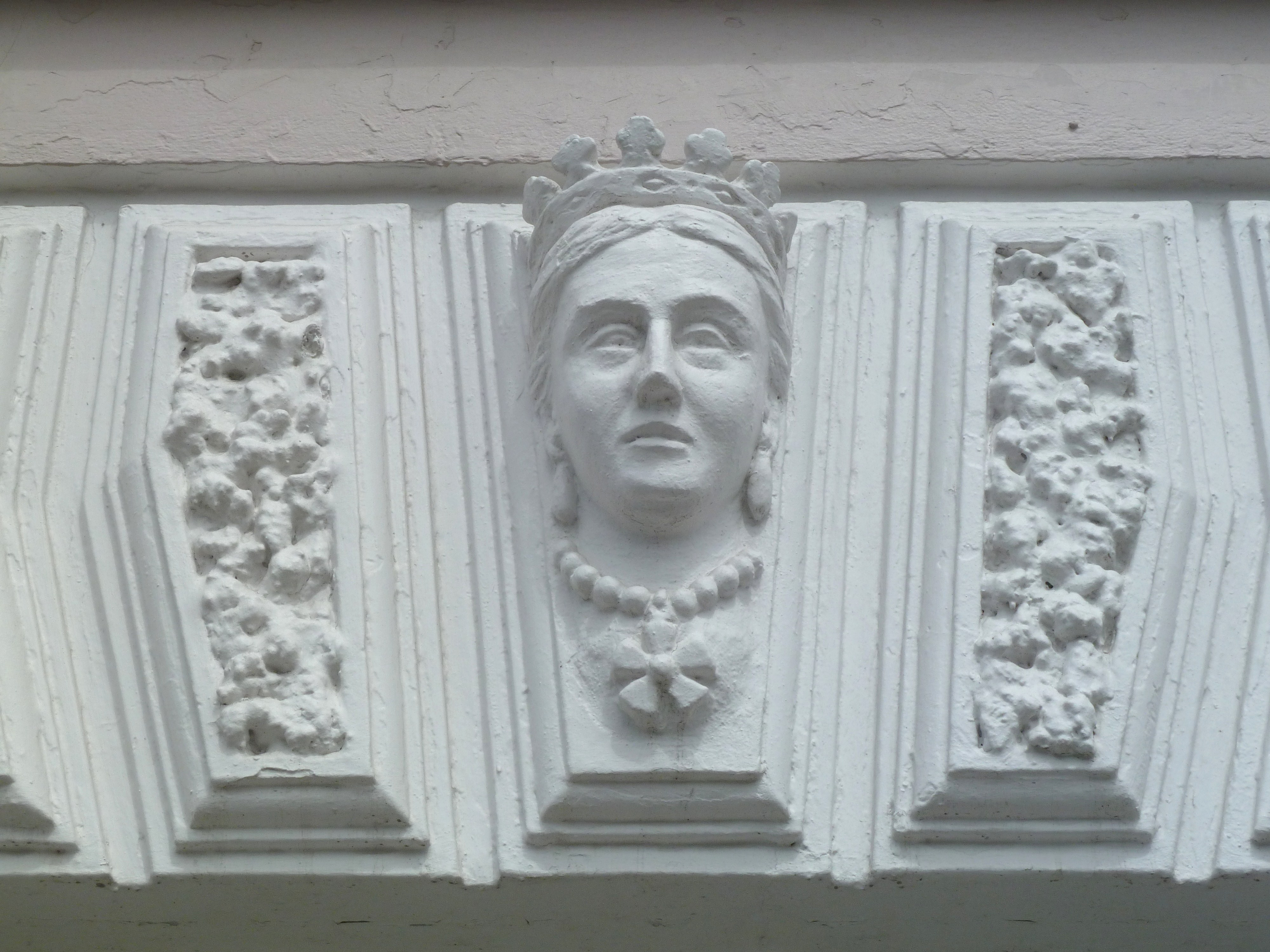
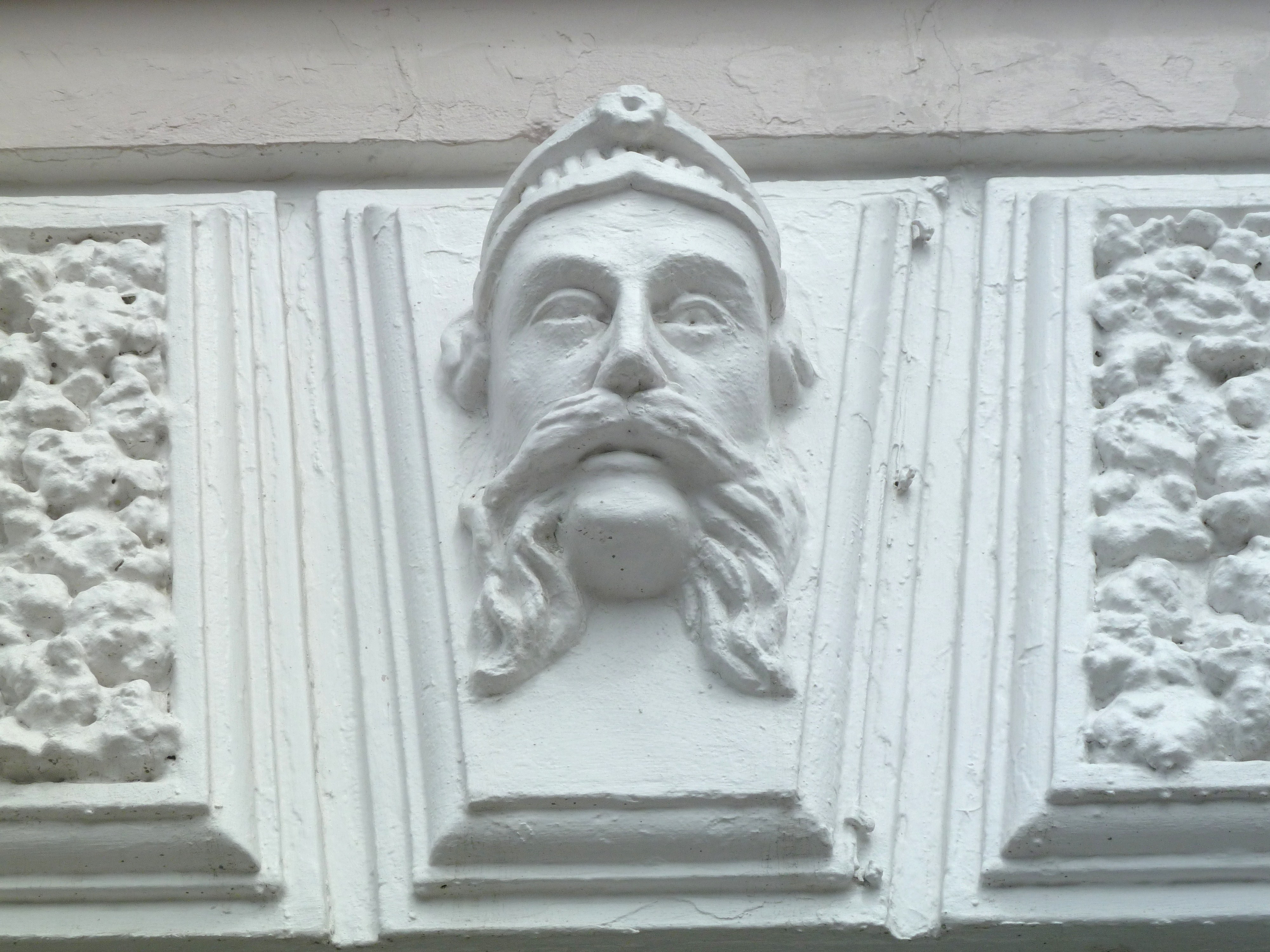
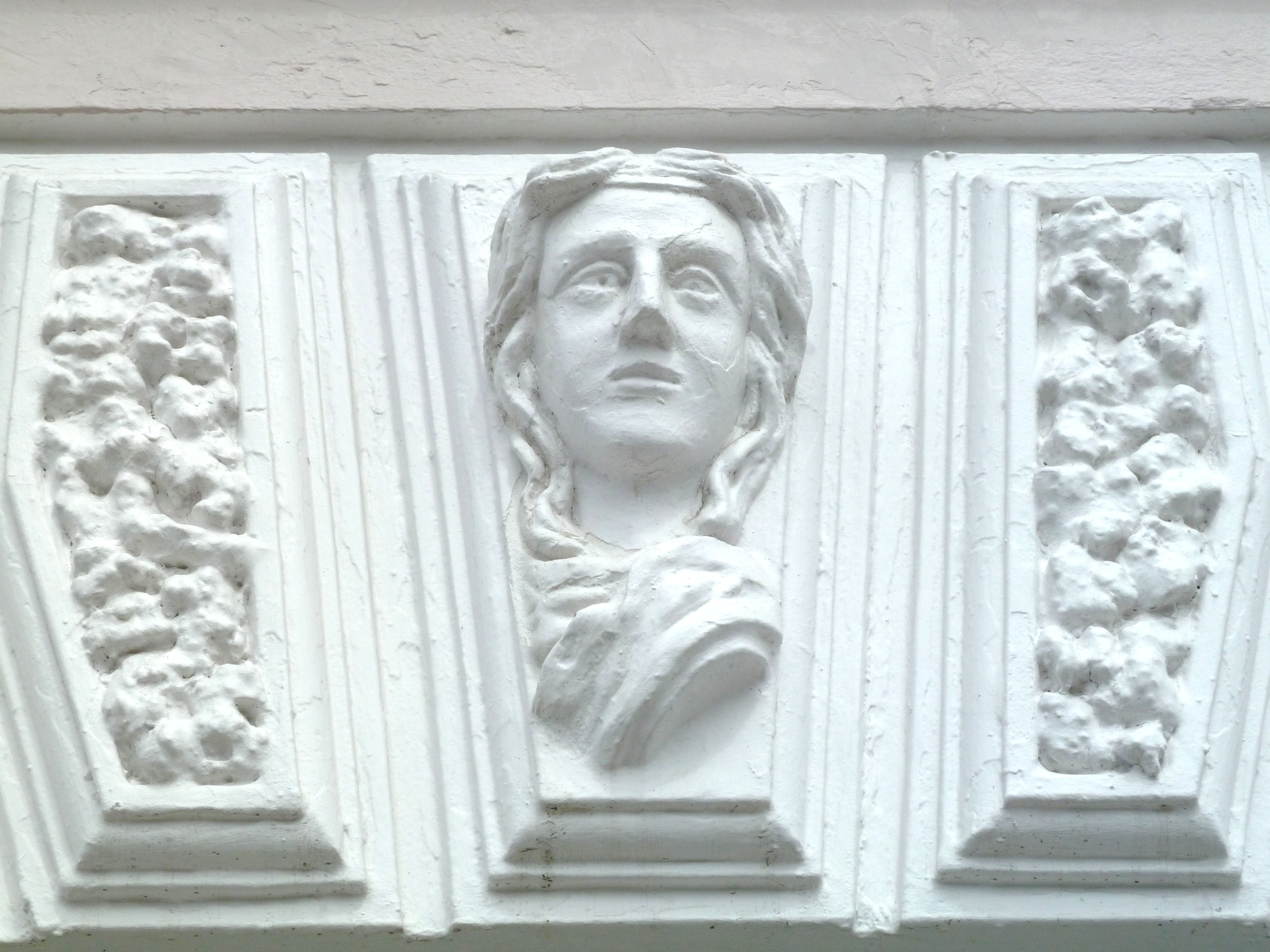
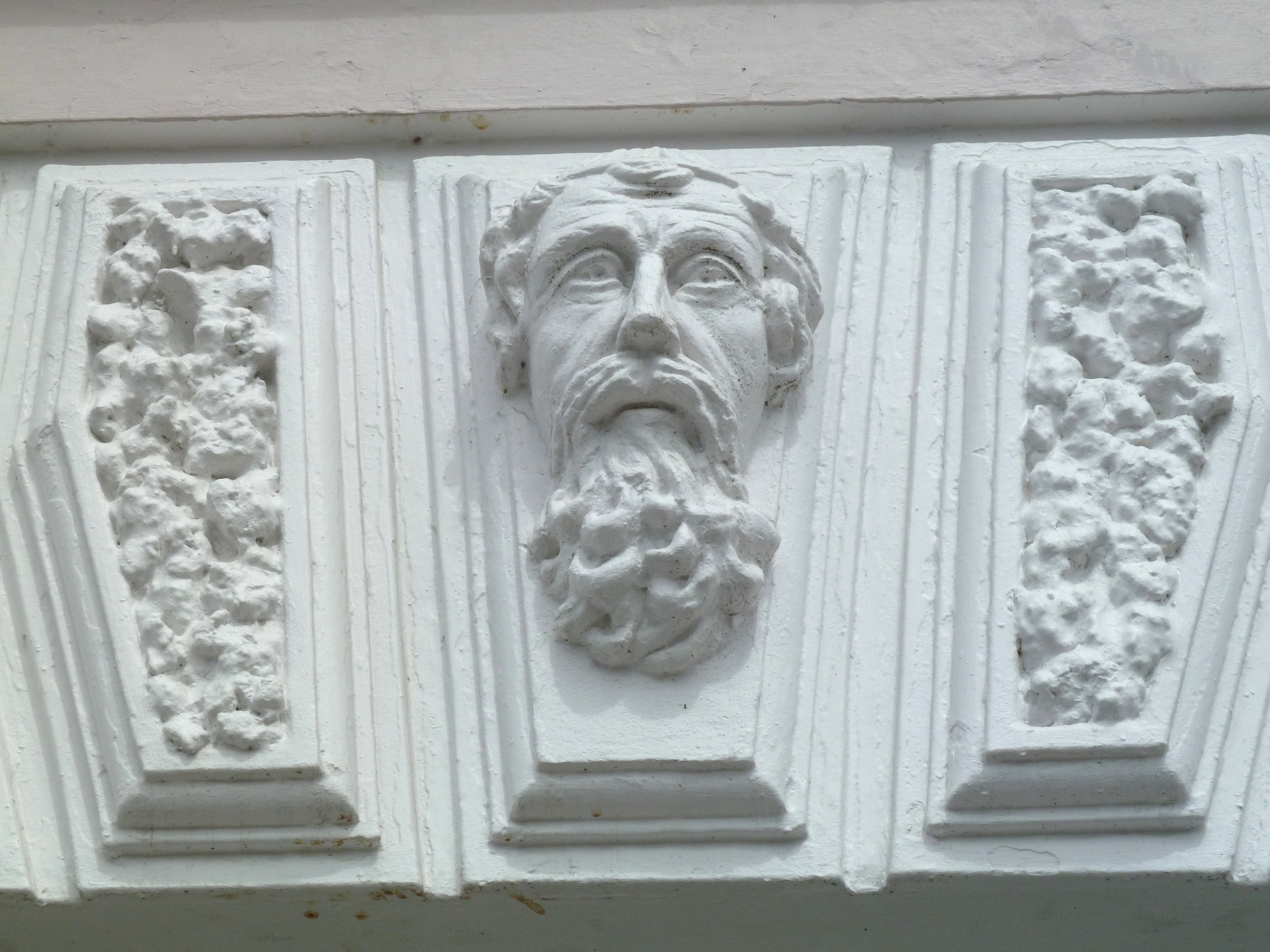
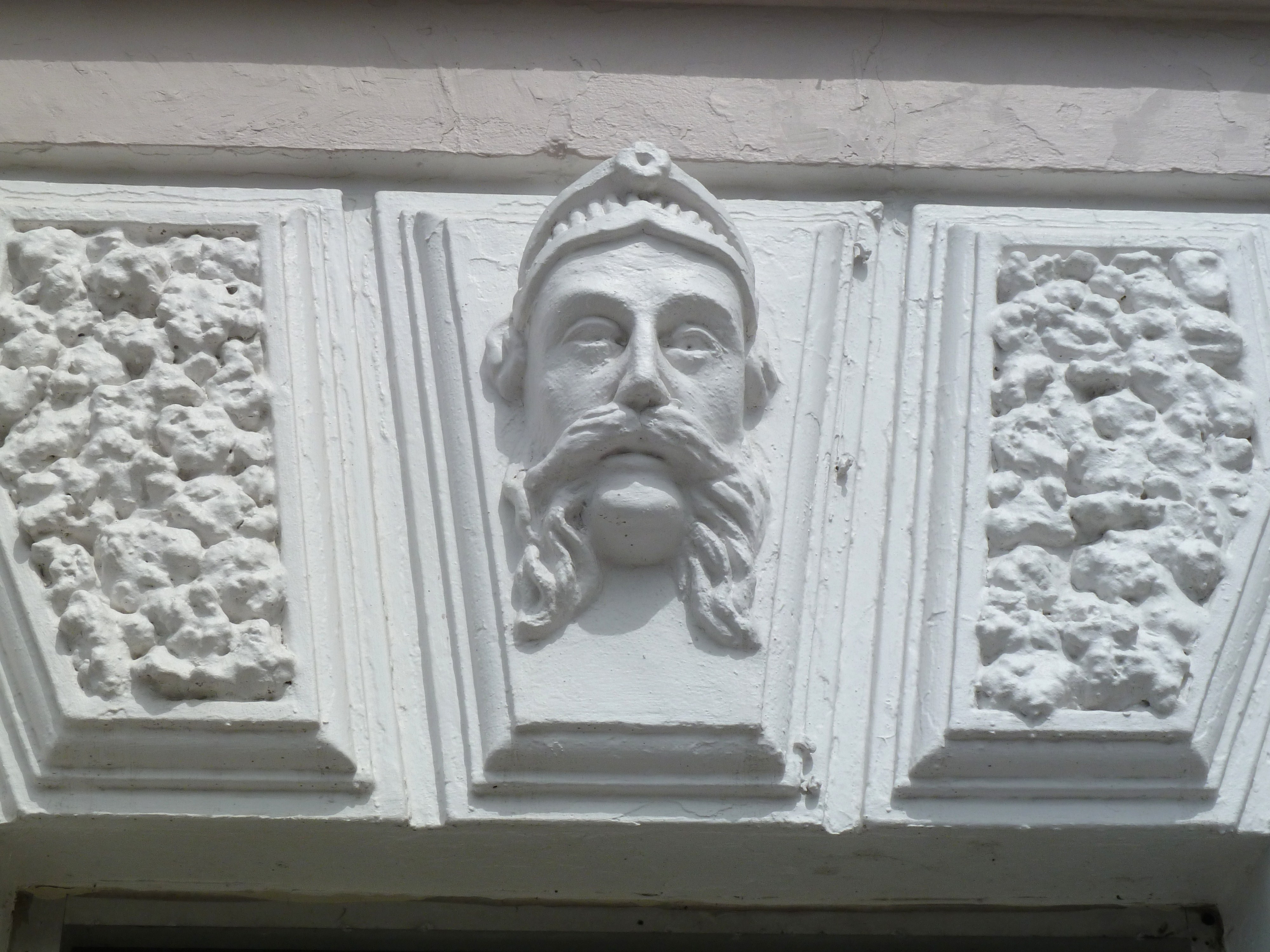
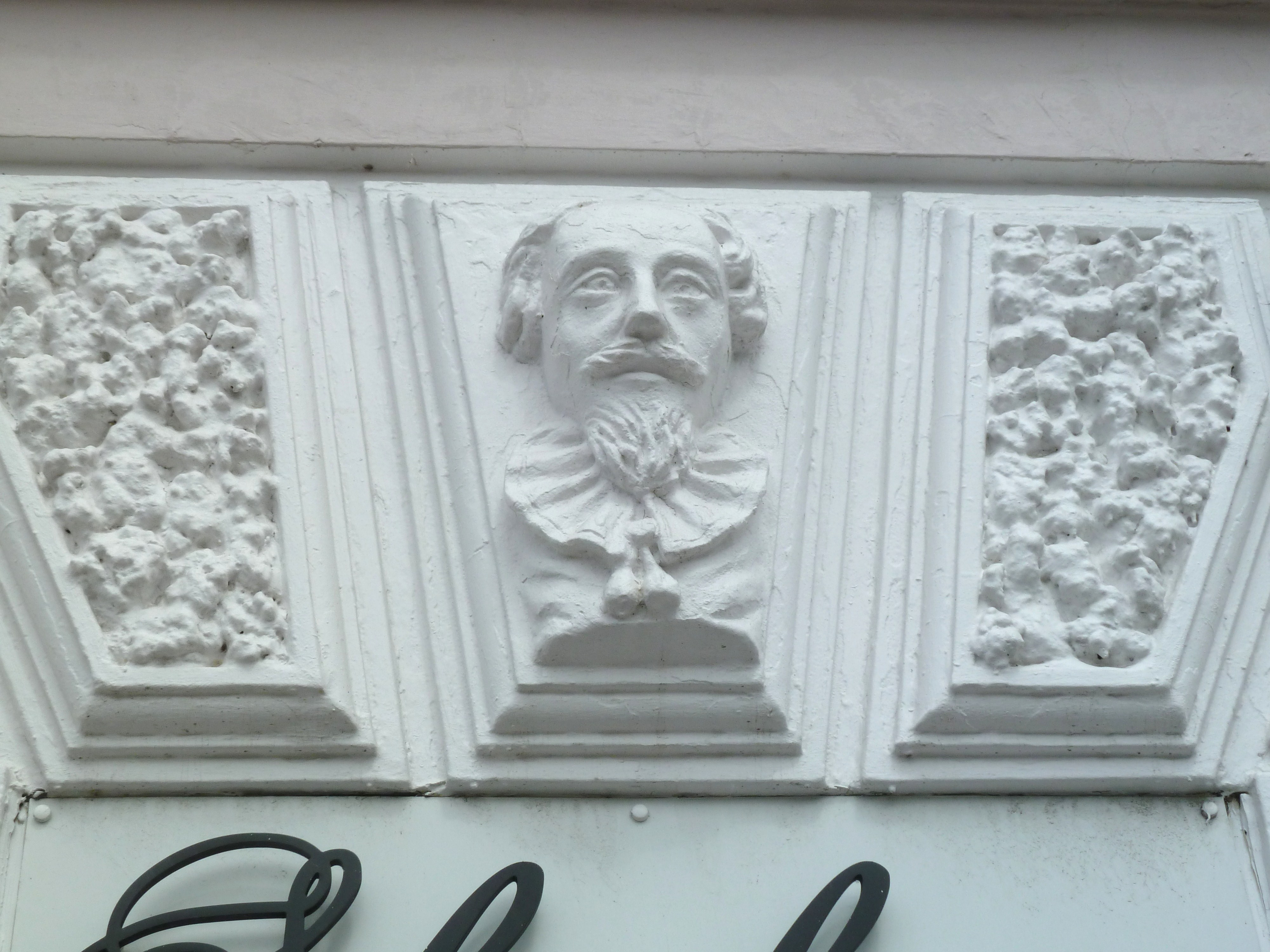

- Lyme Regis, Dorset – Eleanor Coade's country home at Belmont House decorated with Coade stone on its façade.(50.72434°N 2.94006°W), (See § image of Belmont House.)

- Metropolitan Museum of Art ("The Met") – New York City. Faith, statue in 'overpainted Coade stone', after a model by John Bacon the Elder. 1791.(40.7794°N 73.9631°W) (See image in this section above.)
- Montreal – Nelson's Column, built 1809. Montreal's pillar is the second-oldest "Nelson's Column" in the world, after the Nelson Monument in Glasgow. The statue and ornaments were shipped in parts to Montreal, arriving in April 1808. William Gilmore, a local stonemason who had contributed £7 towards its construction, was hired to assemble its seventeen parts and the foundation base was laid on 17 August 1809.(45°30′30″N 73°33′14″W)
- Bank of Montreal. A series of Relief panels based on designs by John Bacon (1740–1799), moulded in Coade stone by Joseph Panzetta and Thomas Dubbin in 1819.(45.5049°N 73.5579°W)
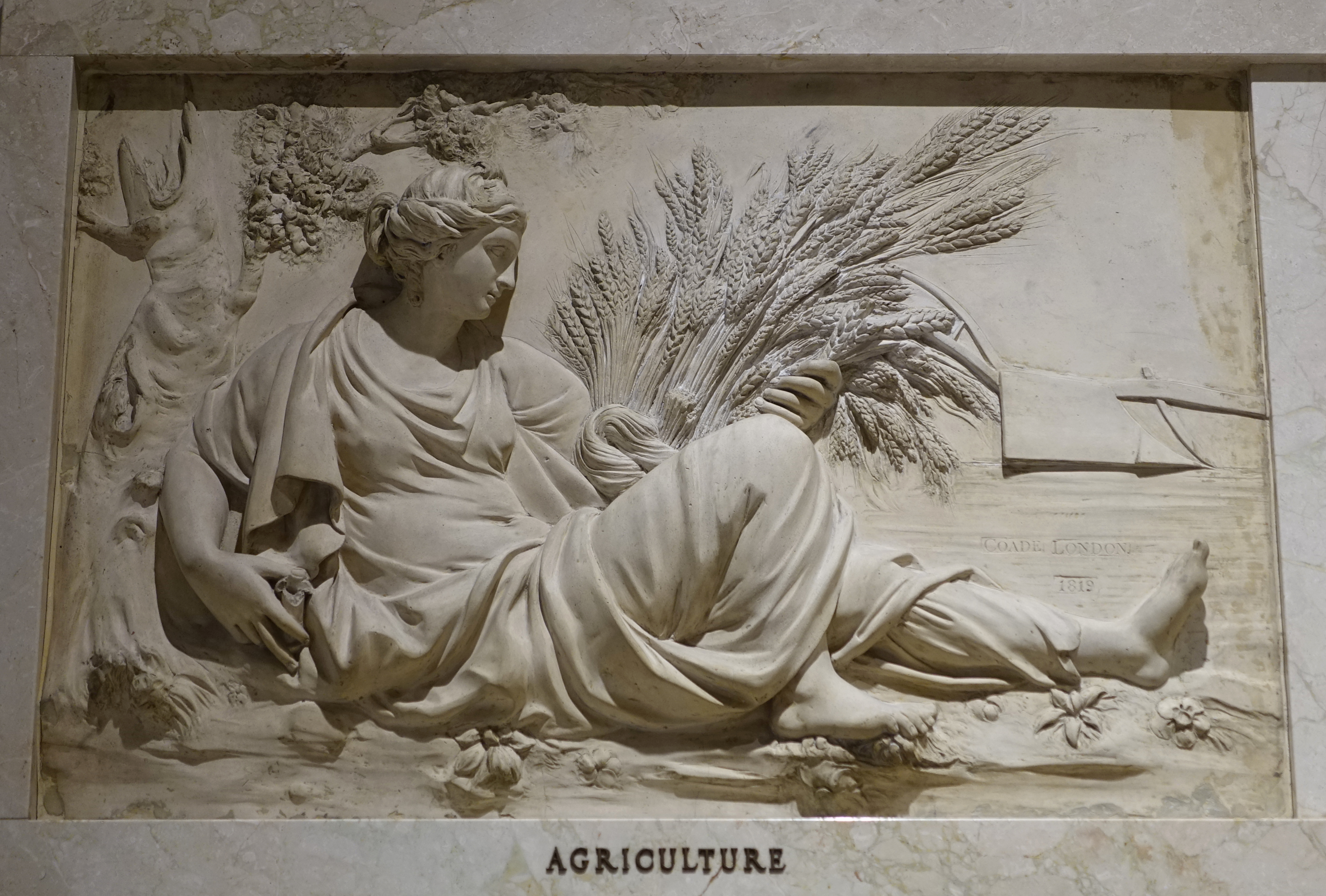
Agriculture
by Joseph Panzetta and Thomas Dubbin

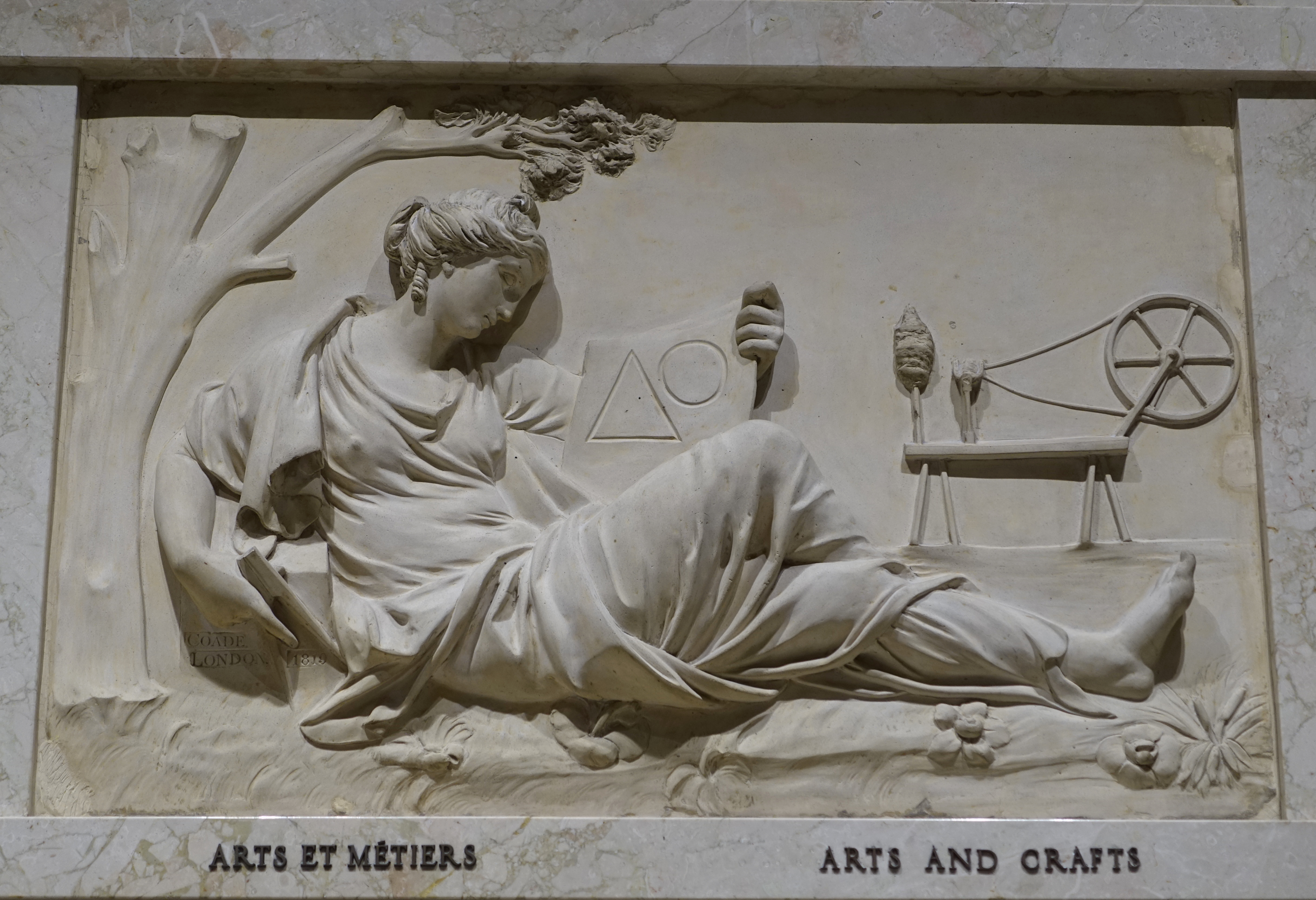
Arts and Crafts
by Joseph Panzetta and Thomas Dubbin

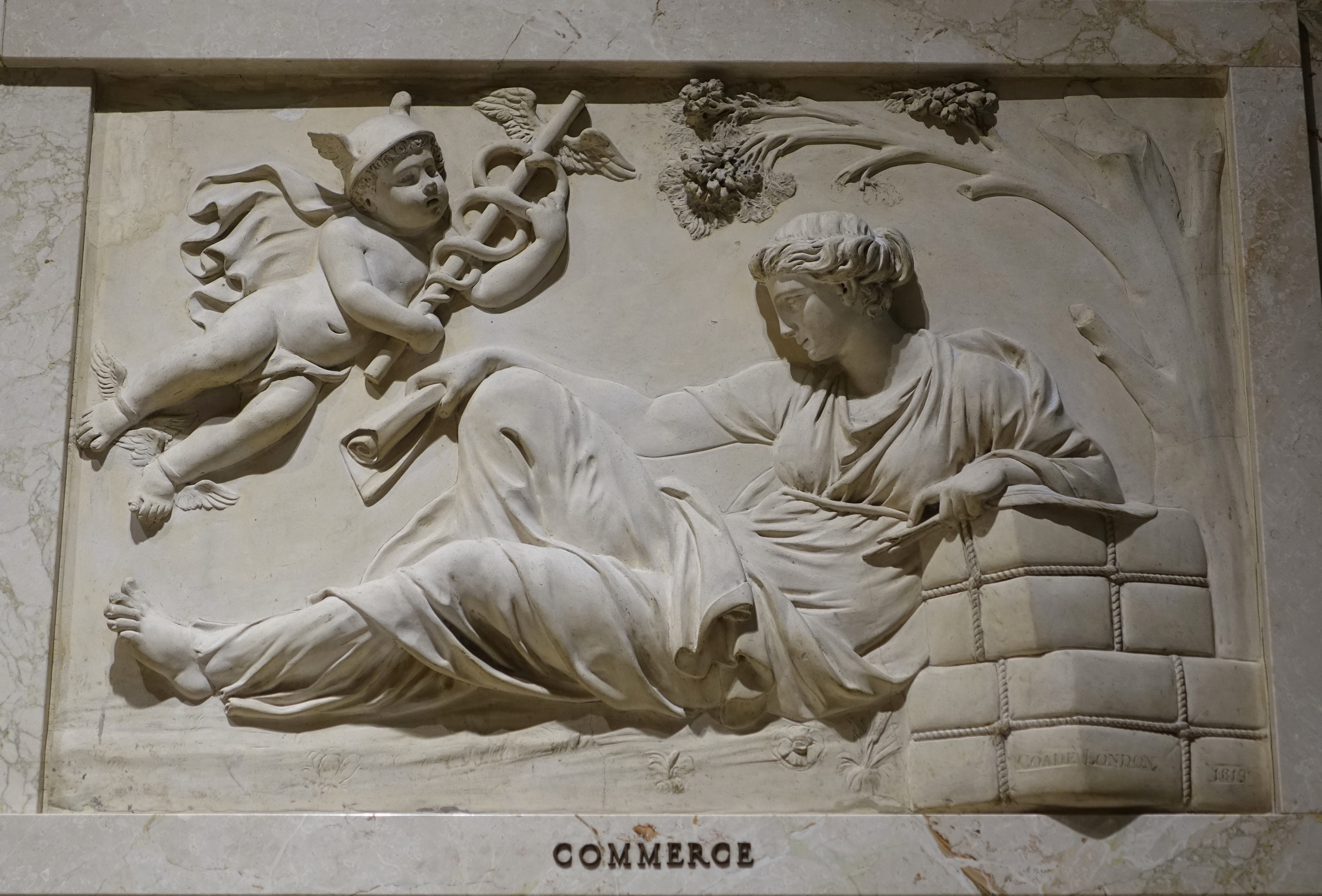
Commerce
by Joseph Panzetta and Thomas Dubbin

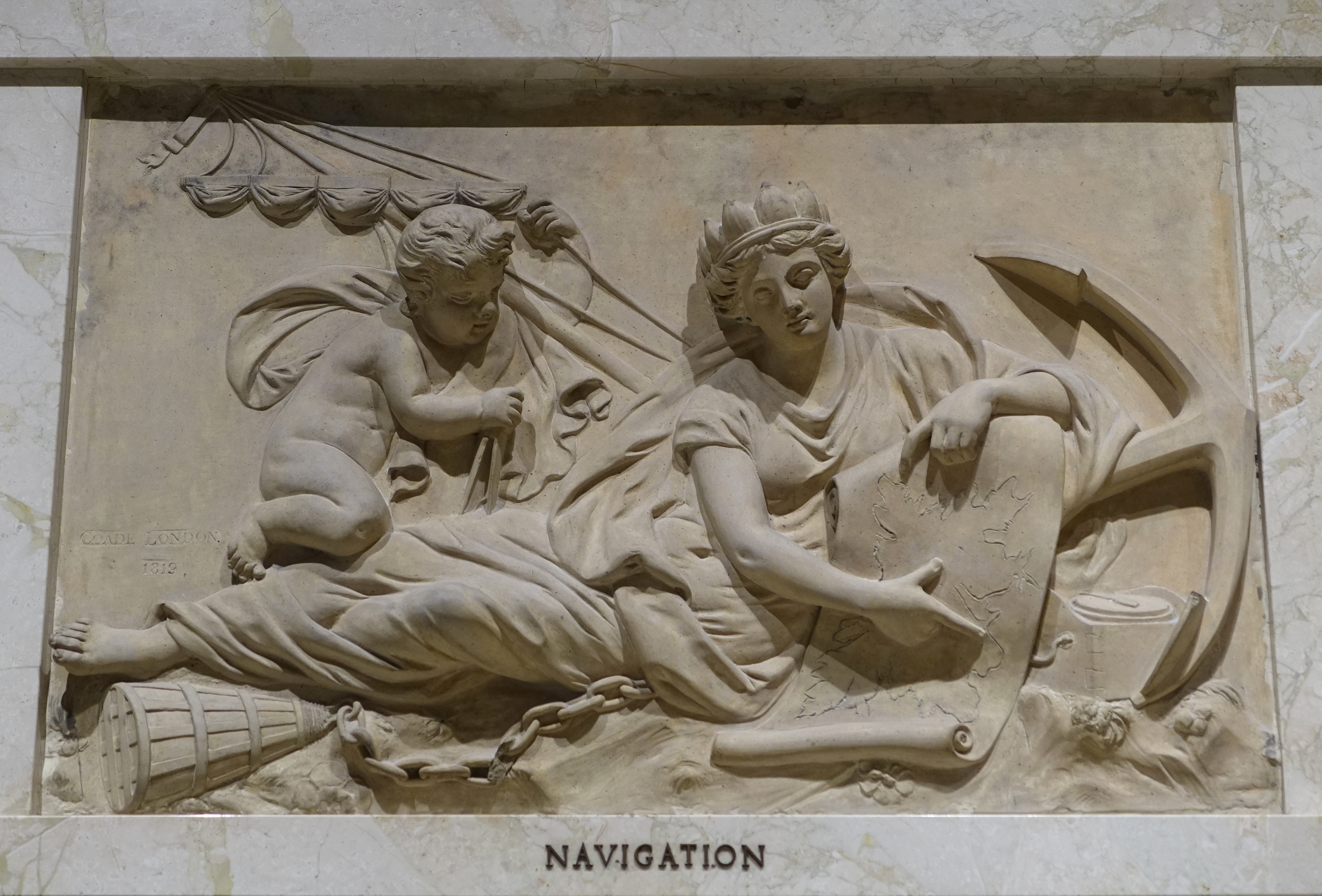
Navigation
by Joseph Panzetta and Thomas Dubbin
- The Octagon House or the John Tayloe III House in Washington, DC, built 1800 by William Thornton. (38°53′46.68″N 77°2′29.40″W)
- North Ockendon, Church of St Mary Magdalene, (Havering). A Grade I listed building, The baptismal font and royal arms (made of Coade stone) were both made in 1842. (51.542°N 0.288°E)
- Paço de São Cristóvão, (Palace of Saint Christopher) Rio de Janeiro, Brazil. In front of the palace is a decorative Coade stone portico, a gift sent by Hugh Percy, 2nd Duke of Northumberland, inspired by Robert Adams' porch for "Sion House". (22°54′20″S 43°13′33″W)

- Pitzhanger Manor House, Ealing, was owned from 1800 to 1810 by the architect Sir John Soane, who radically rebuilt it. It features four Coade stone caryatids atop the columns of the east front, modelled after those that enclose the sanctuary of Pandrosus in Athens. (51.511091°N 0.307210°W), (See § Gallery: Caryatid, Pitzhanger Manor.)

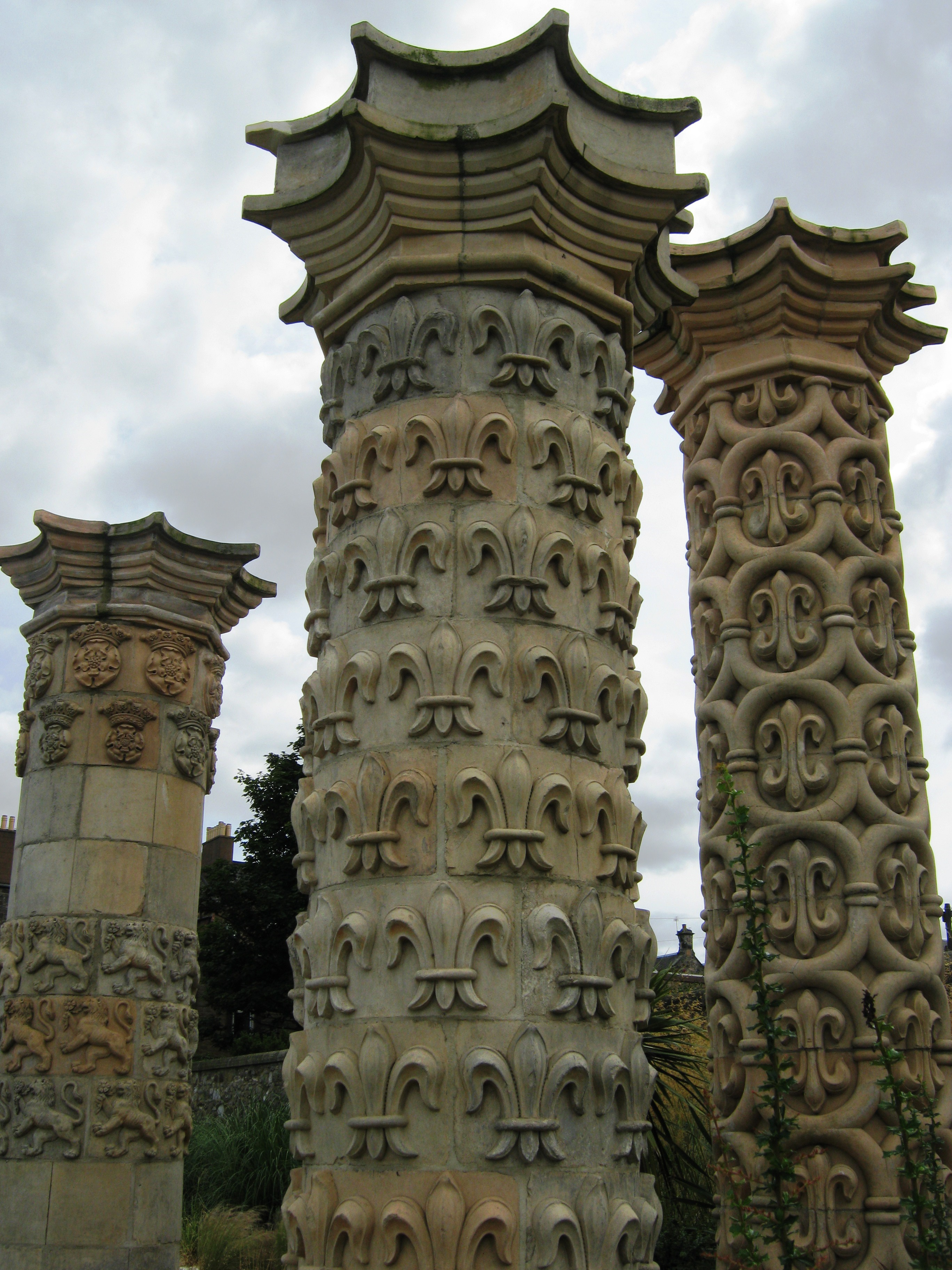
Portobello Beach, three Coade Stone columns in the community garden at 70 Promenade (John Street), rescued from the garden of Argyle House

- Plympton, Devon – St Mary's church, monument to W. Seymour (died 1801) in Coade stone. (50.386°N 4.051°W)

- Portman Square, London. About a third of the north side is in the statutory category scheme, Grade I. No.s 11–15 built in 1773–1776 by architect James Wyatt in cooperation with his brother Samuel Wyatt. First houses in which Coade stone was used. (51.5160229°N 0.15686239°W), (See § Gallery: Portman Square.)

- Portmeirion, Horatio Nelson, 1st Viscount Nelson,
  (See § Portmeirion, Lord Nelson section.)
- Portobello, Edinburgh, Portobello Beach, three Coade Stone columns erected in a community garden, with Heritage Lottery funds in 2006 at 70 Promenade (John Street), Portobello; rescued from the garden of Argyle House, Hope Lane, off Portobello High Street when taken into Council storage in 1989 as a new extension was built onto the house. (55.952090°N 3.104139°W)
- Preston Hall, Midlothian, Significant features of the interior include four life-size female figures in the stairway, which are made from Coade stone, a type of ceramic used as an artificial stone. (55°52′52″N 2°58′11″W)
- Putney Old Burial Ground. The grave of 18th century novelist Harriet Thomson (c. 1719–1787) made of coade stone. (51.4566988°N 0.2032697°W)
- Reading, Berkshire. St Mary's Church, Castle Street. The frontage is rendered in stucco while the capitals of the portico are probably formed of Coade stone. (51°27′13.59″N 0°58′29.32″W)

- Radcliffe Observatory, Tower of the Winds (Oxford). The reliefs of the signs of the zodiac above the windows on the first floor are made of Coade stone by J. C. F. Rossi. (51°45′35″N 1°15′59″W) (See § Gallery: Tower of the Winds.)
- Richmond upon Thames. Two examples of the River God "Father Thames", one outside Ham House, the other in Terrace Gardens. (Ham House-51.444650°N 0.314296°W) (Terrace Gardens-51.453988°N 0.300406°W), (See image in § Gallery.)
- Rio de Janeiro Zoo entrance. (22.904400°S 43.228843°W)
- Roscommon, Ireland, Entrance gate to former Mote Park demesne, The Lion Gate, built 1787, consisting of a Doric triumphal arch surmounted by a lion with screen walls linking it to a pair of identical lodges. (53.590311°N 8.143123°W)

- Saxham Hall, Suffolk has an Umbrello (shelter) constructed of Coade stone in the grounds (52.234094°N 0.630431°E), (See § Gallery: Saxham Hall, Umbrelllo.)

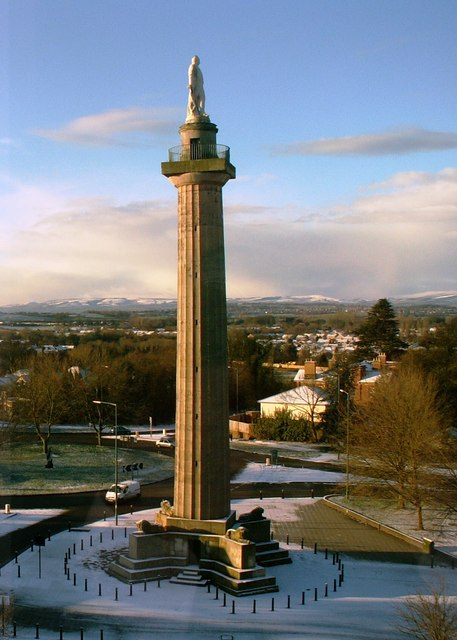
Lord Hill's Column, Shrewsbury. A 17 ft (5.2 m) tall statue of General Rowland Hill, 1st Viscount Hill, modelled in Coade stone by Joseph Panzetta.

- Schomberg House at 81–83 Pall Mall, London, was built for Meinhardt Schomberg, 3rd Duke of Schomberg in the late 17th-century. The porch, framed by two Coade stone figures, was added in the late 18th century. Note – The figures that framed the doorway of the original Coade's Gallery, on Pedlar's Acre at the Surrey end of Westminster Bridge Road were made from the same moulds. (51.505833°N 0.135833°W) (See § Gallery: Schomberg House.)
- Shrewsbury, Shropshire. Lord Hill's Column commemorates General Rowland Hill, 1st Viscount Hill, with a 17 ft (5.2 m) tall statue on a 133 ft 6 in (40.7 m) pillar. The statue was modelled in Lithodipyra (Coade stone) by Joseph Panzetta who worked for Eleanor Coade. (52.7041°N 2.7318°W)

- South Bank Lion at the south end of Westminster Bridge in central London originally stood atop the old Lion Brewery, on the Lambeth bank of the River Thames. The brewery was demolished in 1950, to make way for the South Bank Site of the 1951 Festival of Britain. Just before the demolition King George VI ordered that both lions should be preserved:

- The lion which originally stood over one of the brewery gates is now painted gold and located at the west-gate entrance of Twickenham Stadium, the home of English rugby. (See § Examples: Twickenham Stadium Lion.)

- The lion from the roof of the brewery, now known as the "South Bank Lion", was moved to Station Approach Waterloo, placed on a high plinth, and painted red as the symbol of British Rail. When removed, the initials of the sculptor William F. Woodington and the date, 24 May 1837, were discovered under one of its paws. In 1966, it was moved from outside Waterloo station to the south end of Westminster Bridge. (51.500836°N 0.119581°W), (See image of South Bank Lion.)

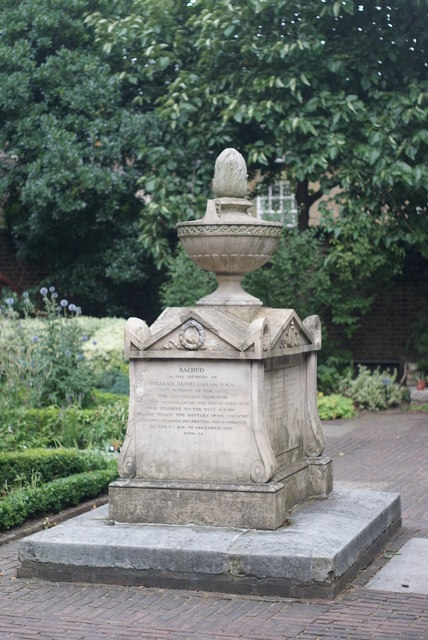
Captain William Bligh's Tomb surmounted by an eternal flame. Church of St Mary-at-Lambeth (now the Garden Museum).

- Southwark – Statue of King Alfred the Great, Trinity Church Square. The statue of a king on the stone plinth in the square is Grade II-listed. The provenance is unknown, but it may be either one of eight medieval statues from the north end towers of Westminster Hall (c. late 14th century) or, alternatively, one of a pair representing Alfred the Great and Edward, the Black Prince made for the garden of Carlton House in the 18th century. Analysis in 2021 showed that the top part was of Coade stone but the legs were Roman and of Bath stone.(51.498815°N 0.093713°W), (See § Gallery: King Alfred the Great.)
- St Botolph-without-Bishopsgate Church Hall, London, pair of statues of schoolchildren on the front of this former School House, replicas outside, listed originals now inside the Hall.(51.516708°N 0.081656°W)
- St Mary-at-Lambeth, Garden Museum, London – Captain Bligh's tomb in the churchyard of St Mary's Lambeth.(51.4950°N 0.1202°W)
- Shugborough Hall, Staffordshire. A large country house, between 1760 and 1770 the house was remodelled by "Athenian" Stuart, the giant portico was added to the front in 1794 by Samuel Wyatt. In front of the house is the portico, which has eight columns in wood faced with slate, and capitals in Coade stone. On the south front is another bowed bay.(52.80003°N 2.01290°W)
- St Mary Magdalene's Church, Stapleford, Leicestershire. In the west wall of the gallery is a Coade stone fireplace, above which are the Royal arms on a roundel.(52.7553°N 0.7987°W)
- Stourhead Gardens The 'Temple of Flora' contains a replica of the Borghese Vase modelled in Coade stone dating from 1770 to 1771. 51.108°N 2.3191°W
- Stowe Gardens, a grade I listed landscape garden in Stowe, Buckinghamshire.(52.031963°N 1.017560°W)

- 'The Oxford Gates'. The central piers were designed by William Kent in 1731 Pavilions at either end were added in the 1780s to the design of the architect Vincenzo Valdrè. The piers have coats of arms in Coade stone.

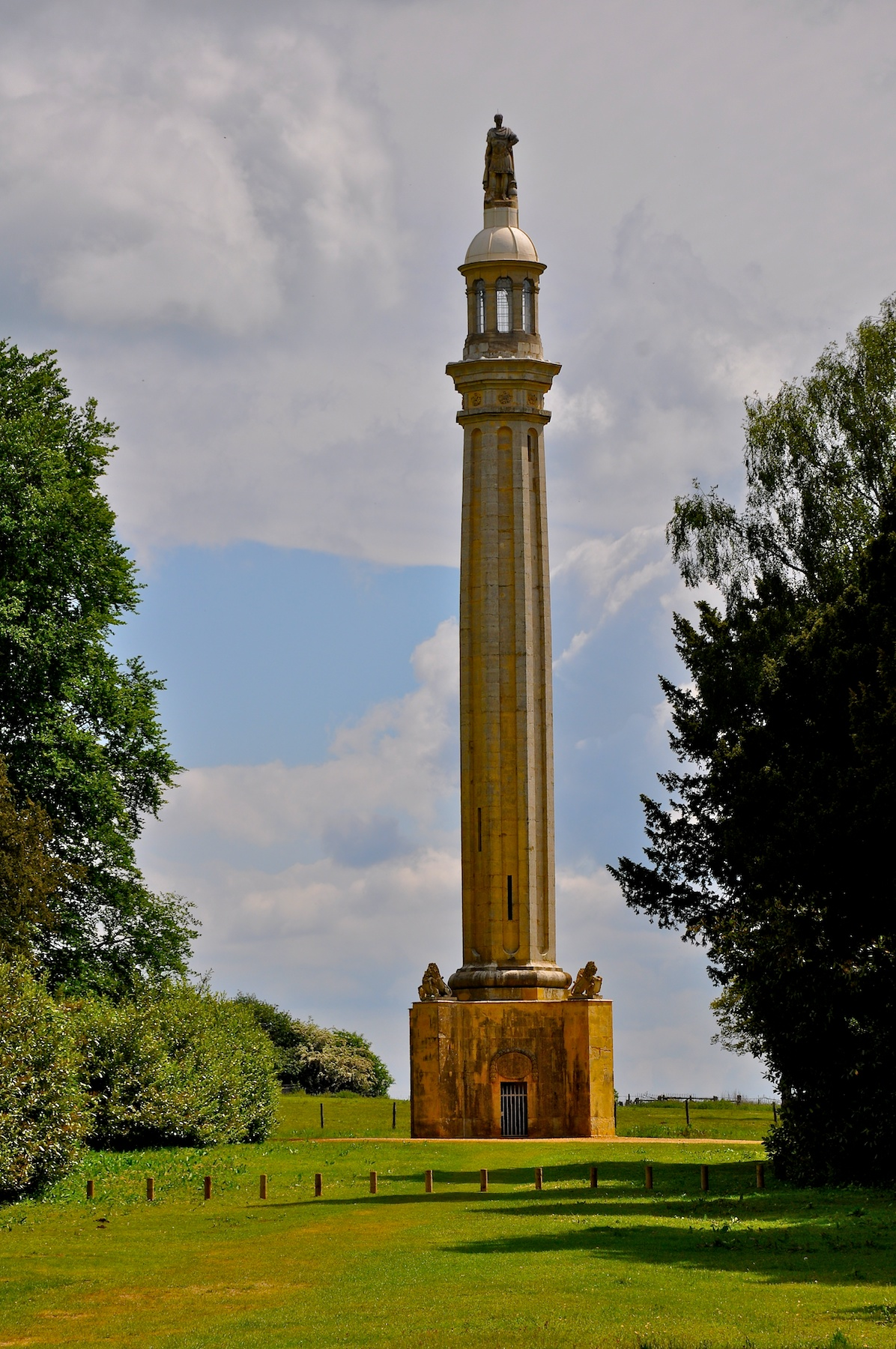
Stowe Gardens 'The Cobham Monument' The plinth is surmounted by Coade stone lions holding shields. (1778)

- 'The Gothic Cross' erected in 1814 from Coade stone on the path linking the Doric Arch to the Temple of Ancient Virtue. It was erected by the 1st Duke of Buckingham and Chandos as a memorial to his mother Lady Mary Nugent. It was demolished in the 1980s by a falling elm tree. The National Trust rebuilt the cross in 2017 using several of the surviving pieces of the monument.

- 'The Cobham Monument' is the tallest structure in the gardens. It incorporates a square plinth with corner buttresses surmounted by Coade stone lions holding shields added in 1778.

- 'The Gothic Umbrello' also called the Conduit House a small octagonal pavilion dating from the 1790s. The coat of arms of the Marquess of Buckingham, dated 1793, made from Coade stone are placed over the entrance door.

- Teigngrace Devon. James Templer (1748–1813), the builder of the Stover Canal, is commemorated by a Coade stone monument in Teigngrace church.(50°33′20″N 3°37′36″W)
- Tong, Shropshire – St Bartholomew's Church. The church's north door served as the "Door of Excommunication". A stoneworked version of the Royal Arms of George III, is located above the north door which is made of Coade stone. The monument cost £60 in 1814, and was a present from George Jellicoe to celebrate the Peace of Paris and Napoleon's exile to Elba.(52°39′49.9″N 2°18′12.6″W)

- Towcester Racecourse on the Easton Neston estate – Main Entrance Gate decorated with an array of dogs, urns and vases surmounted by the Fermor arms, signed by William Croggon.(52.122437°N 0.973085°W), (See § Gallery: Towcester racecourse / Easton Neston House.)

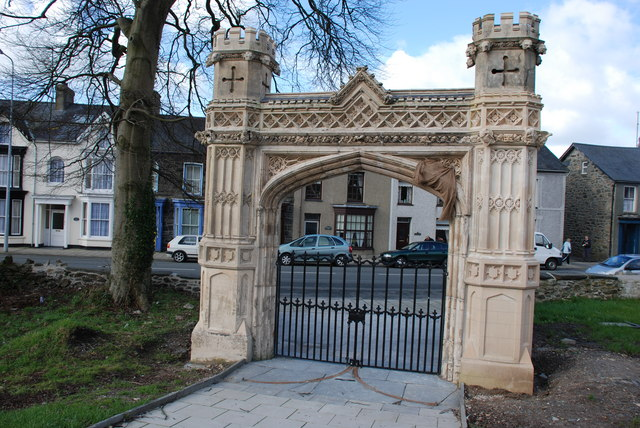
Restored gateway to St Mary's Church Tremadog

- Tremadog, Gwynedd, Wales. St Mary's Church Lychgate. Tremadog was founded, planned, named for and built by William Madocks between 1798 and 1811. The Lychgate to the churchyard is spanned by a decorative arch of Coade stone, containing boars, dragons, frogs, grimacing cherubs, owls, shrouded figures and squirrels, while the tops of the towers are surrounded by elephant heads.(52.938678°N 4.140833°W)

- Twickenham Stadium Lion gate. (R.F.U.) The lion was sculpted in Coade stone by William F. Woodington in 1837 and paired with the "South Bank Lion" at the Lion Brewery on the Lambeth bank of the River Thames. It is now located above the central pillar of the Rowland Hill Memorial Gate (Gate 3) at Twickenham Stadium. It was covered with gold leaf prior to the 1991 Rugby World Cup held in England. The Lion brewery was damaged by fire and closed in 1931, and then demolished in 1949 to make way for the Royal Festival Hall. (51.45536464°N 0.3429844877°W) (See image.)
- Twinings' first ever (and still operating) shop's frontispiece, in the Strand, London opposite the Royal Courts of Justice, rediscovered under soot after a century.(51.513347°N 0.112924°W)
- University of Maryland, College Park, United States – The keystone, featuring a carving of the head of Silenus, above the entry to The Rossborough Inn.(38.9853°N 76.9376°W)

- University of East London, Stratford Campus. Statue of William Shakespeare. (See § Gallery: Shakespeare, University of East London.)
- Weymouth, Dorset. King's Statue, (Weymouth) is a tribute to George III on the seafront.(50.611973°N 2.453883°W)
- Weston Park, in Weston-under-Lizard, Staffordshire.

- Sundial, 1825. The sundial in the grounds of the hall is in Coade stone, and is 1 metre (3 ft 3 in) high. It has a triangular plan with concave sides. At the bottom is a plinth with meander decoration on a circular base, the sides are moulded with festoons at the top, in the angles are caryatids, and at the top is a fluted frieze and an egg-and-dart cornice. (52.69258°N 2.28442°W)

- Two urns and planting basin, 1825. The urns and planting basin are in Coade stone, and are to the southwest of the 'Temple of Diana'. The basin has a diameter of 2 metres (6 ft 7 in), with a cabled rim to the kerb. The urns are on a base, and each has a short stem, and a wide body with guilloché decoration and carvings of lions' heads. (52.69121°N 2.28204°W)

- Whiteford House, Cornwall. The stables and a garden folly (called Whiteford Temple) survive. The Temple is owned by the Landmark Trust and let as a holiday cottage. There are Coade stone plaques on the exterior.(50.546°N 4.316°W)
- Windsor Castle, St George's Chapel. Mrs Coade was commissioned by King George III to make the Gothic screen designed by Henry Emlyn, and possibly also replace part of the ceiling of St George's Chapel. (51.48376°N 0.60678°W)
- Woodeaton Manor, Oxford. In 1775 John and Elizabeth Weyland had the old manor house demolished and the present Woodeaton Manor built. In 1791 the architect Sir John Soane enhanced its main rooms with marble chimneypieces, added an Ionic porch of Coade stone, a service wing and an ornate main hall.(51.805°N 1.225°W)

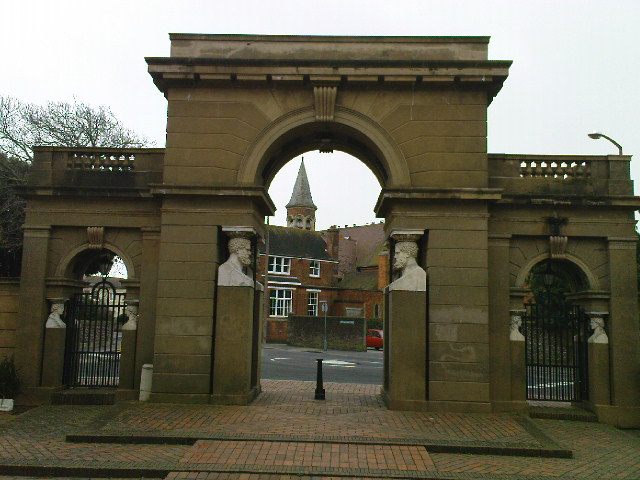
The triumphal arch at Park Crescent, Worthing

- Woodhall Park is a Grade I listed country house, Watton-at-Stone, Hertfordshire. Limited use of Coade stone in the park.(51°51′11″N 0°05′23″W)
- Woolverstone Hall, Ipswich, The house, now a school, is built of Woolpit brick, with Coade stone ornamentation. (52.00152°N 1.19636°E)
- Park Crescent, Worthing, A triumphal arch. The main archway, designed for carriages, contains the busts of four bearded men as atlantes. The two side arches, designed for pedestrians, each contain the busts of four young ladies as caryatids. The Coade stone busts were supplied by William Croggan, successor to Eleanor Coade.(50°48′51″N 0°22′43″W)

== Birkbeck Image library ==
In 2020, the library of Birkbeck, University of London, launched the Coade Stone image collection online, consisting of digitised slides of examples of Coade stone bequeathed by Alison Kelly, whose book Coade Stone was described by Caroline Stanford as "the most authoritative treatment on the subject".

== Gallery ==
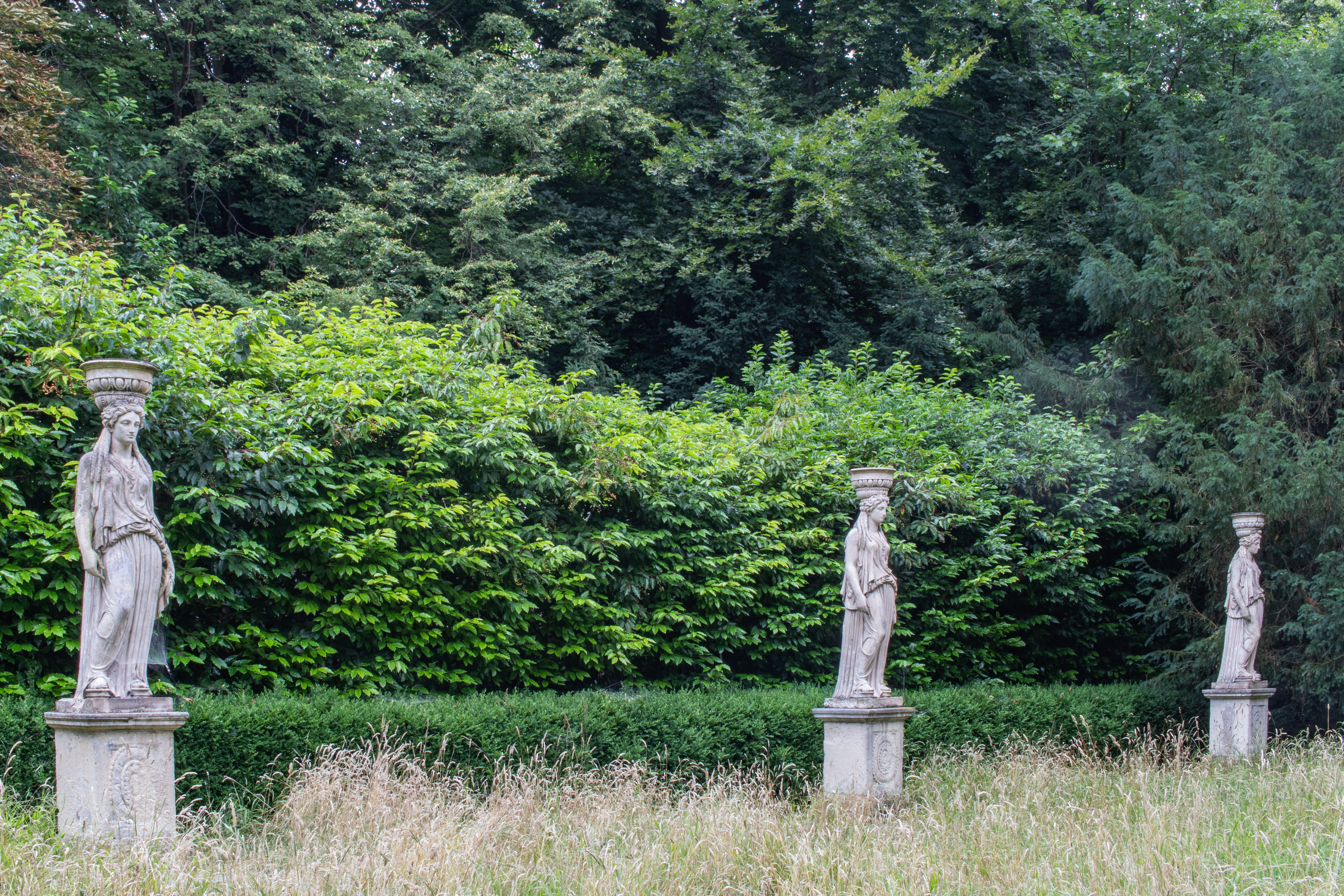
Three of Six Caryatids, Coronation Avenue, Anglesey Abbey, Cambridgeshire

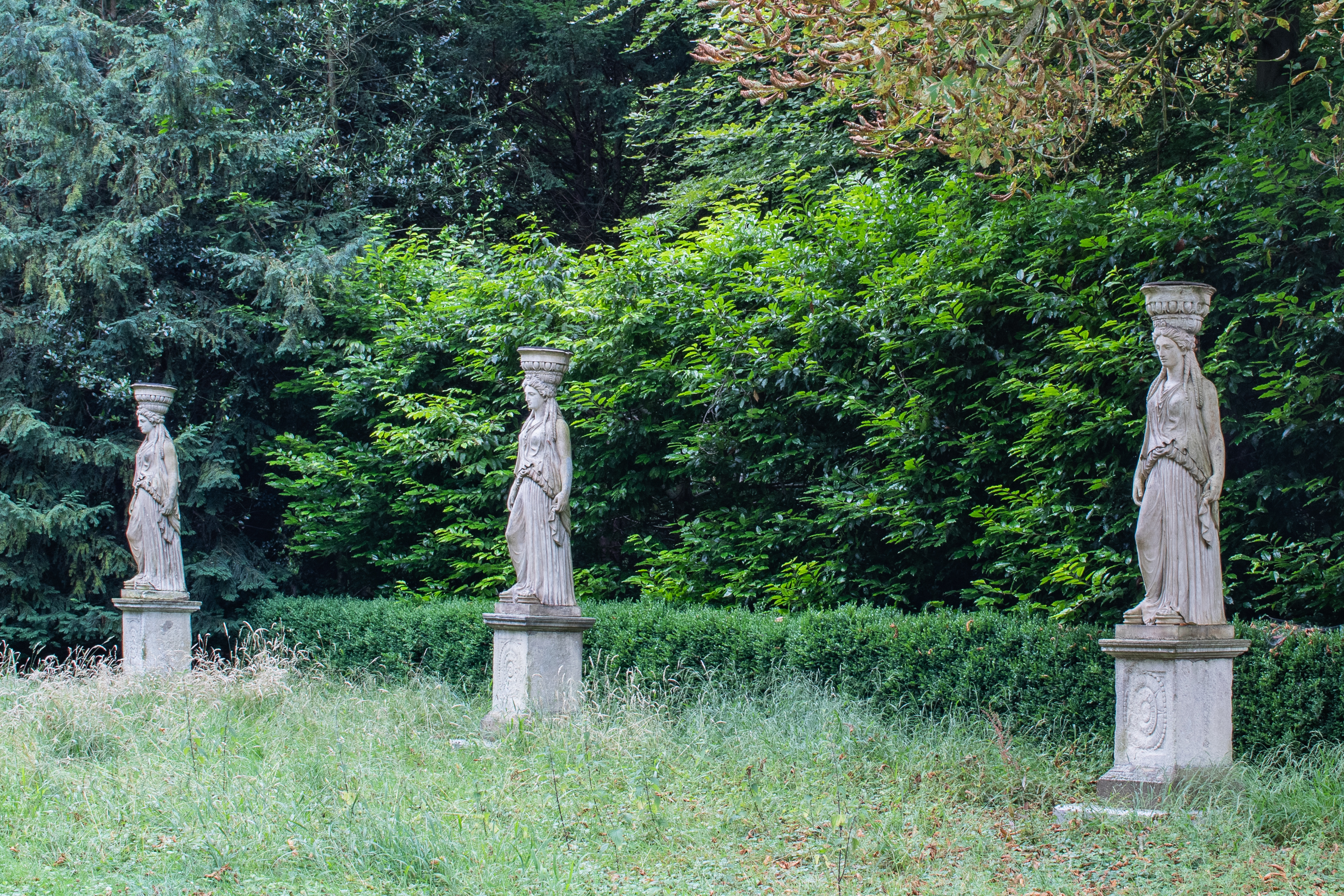
Three of Six Caryatids, Coronation Avenue, Anglesey Abbey, Cambridgeshire

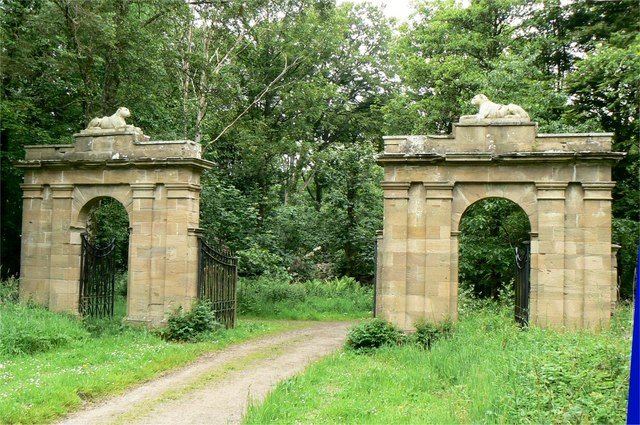
Culzean Castle. Cat Gates – the original inner entrance, with Coade stone cats surmounting the pillars.
(See § Examples: Culzean Castle.)

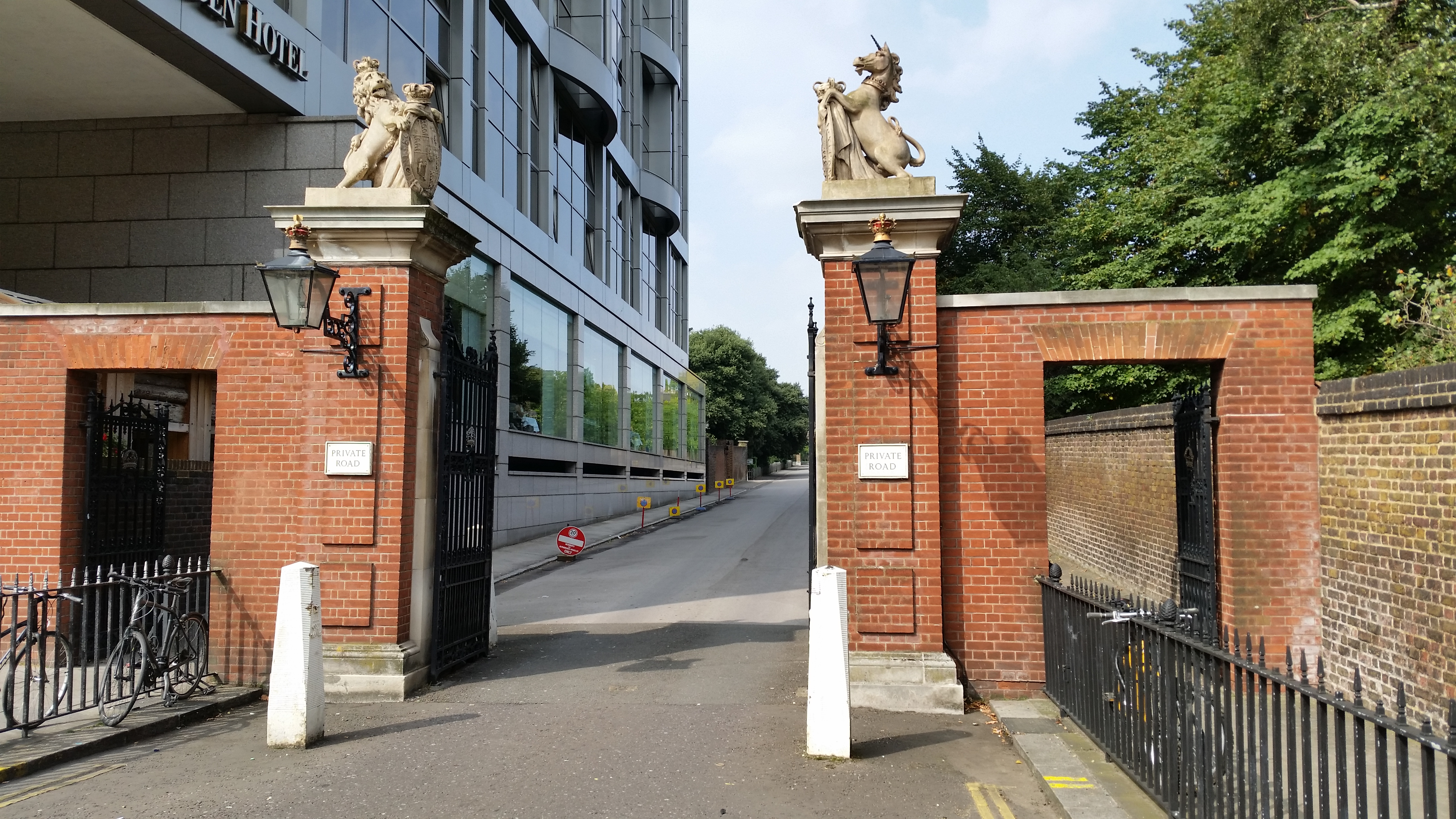
Lion and Unicorn gate,
entrance to Kensington Palace
(See § Examples: Kensington Palace.)

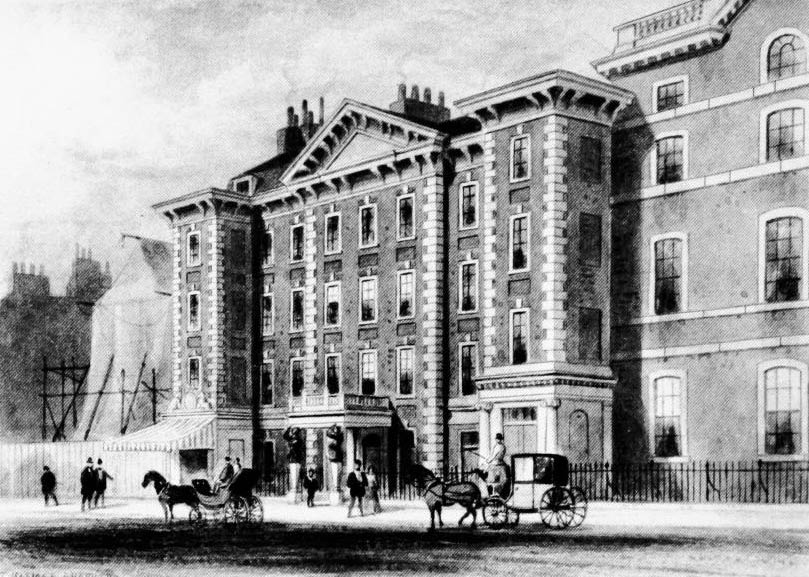
Schomberg House circa 1850
(See § Examples: Schomberg House.)

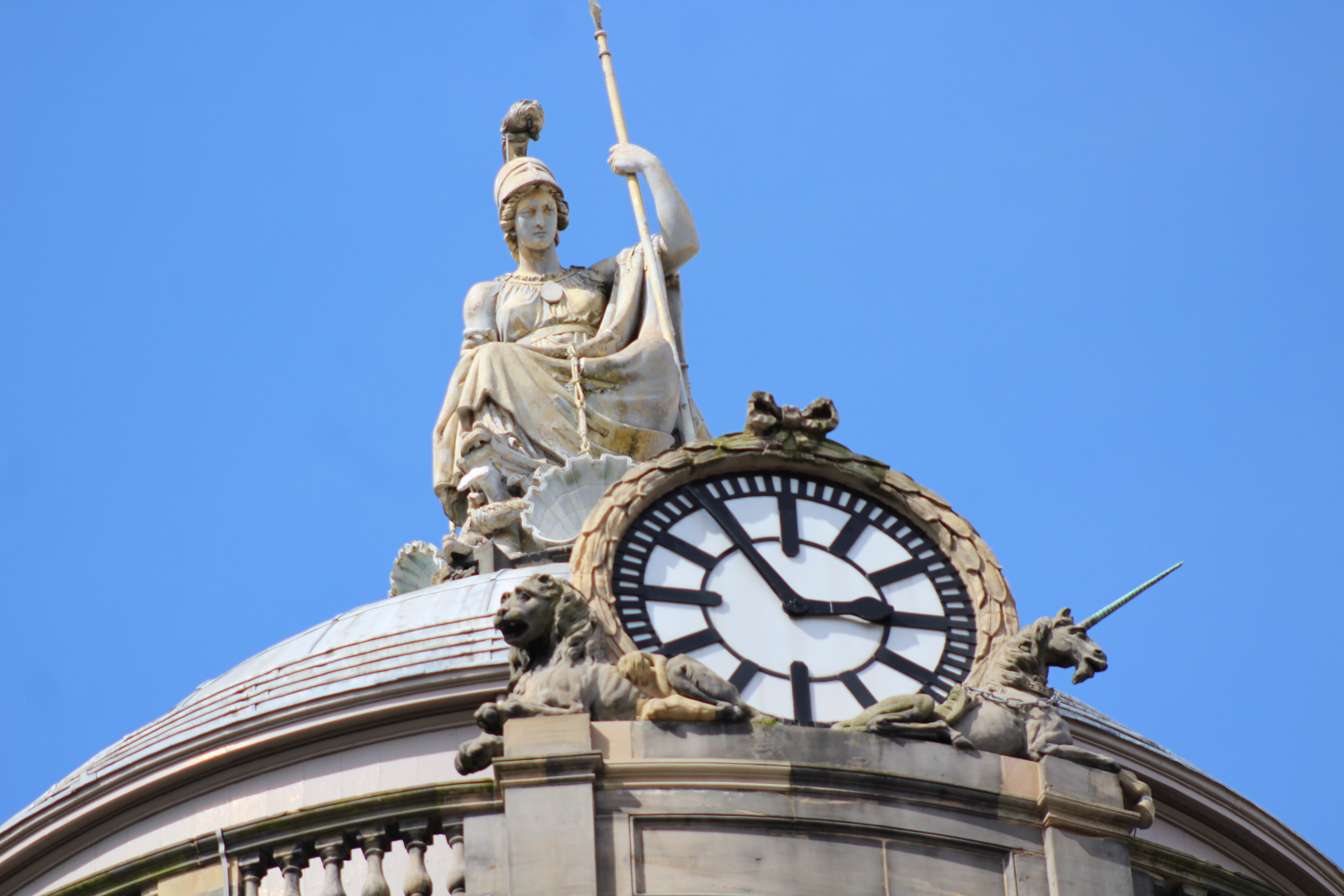
1802 statue by Charles Rossi – Britannia or Minerva atop Liverpool Town Hall
(See § Examples: Liverpool Town Hall.)

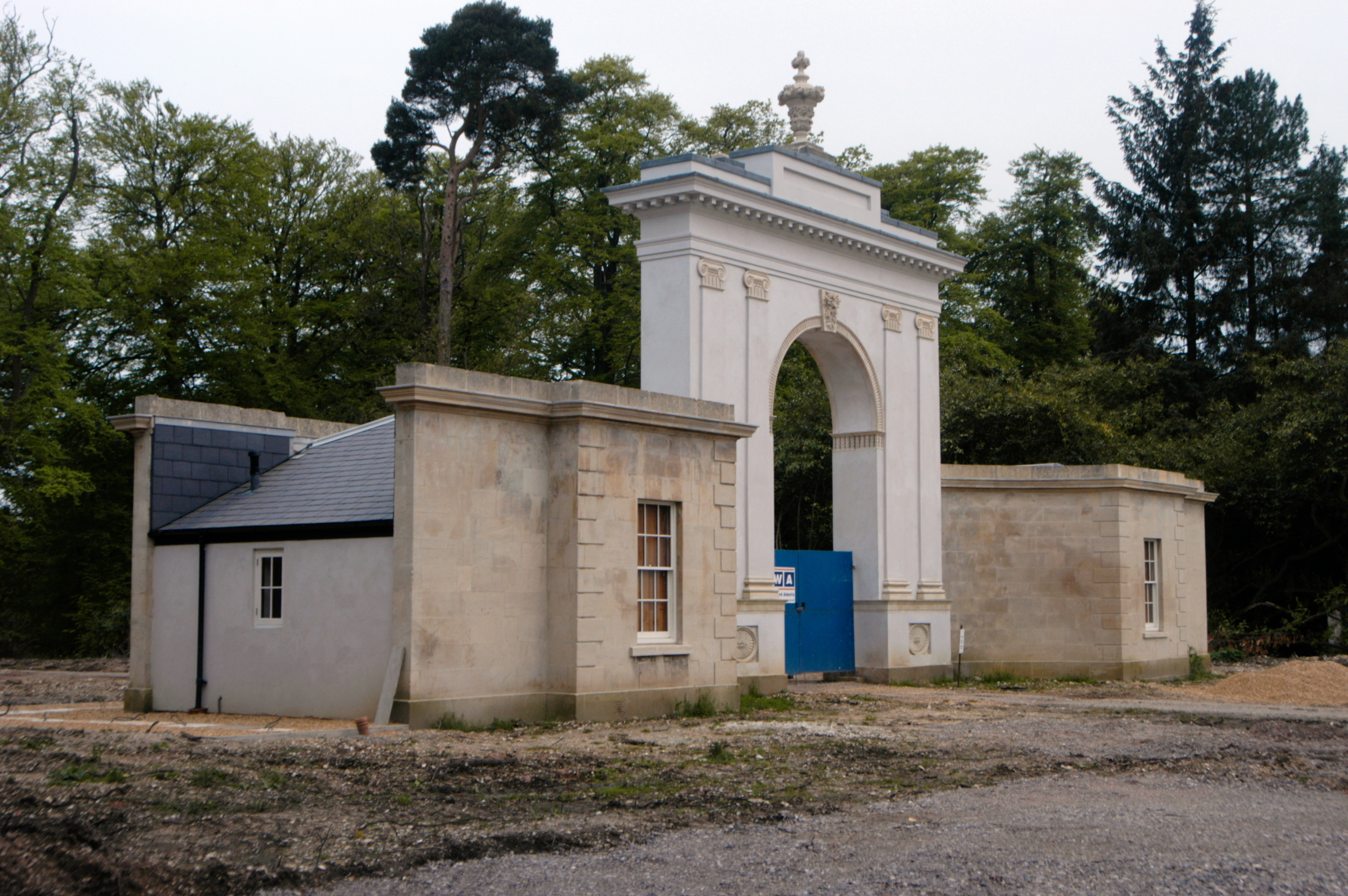
London Lodge (1793), Highclere Castle, Hampshire. Coade stone dressed brick. (1840), Highclere Castle, Hampshire, May 2014
(See § Examples: Highclere Castle, London Lodge.)

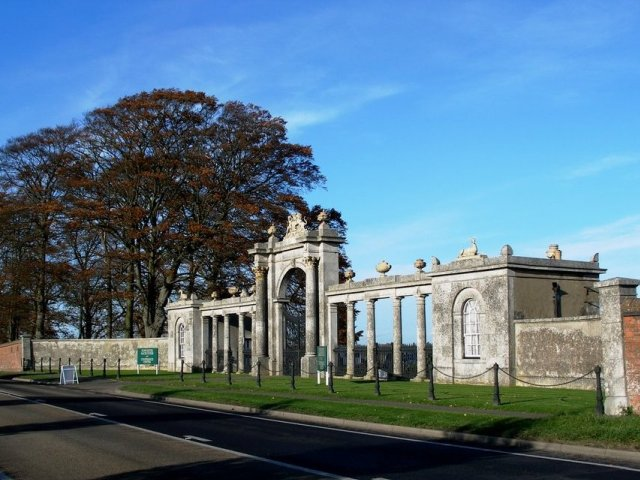
Easton Neston Gate – Main Entrance to Towcester Racecourse – surmounted by the Fermor arms
(See § Examples: Towcester/Easton Neston.)

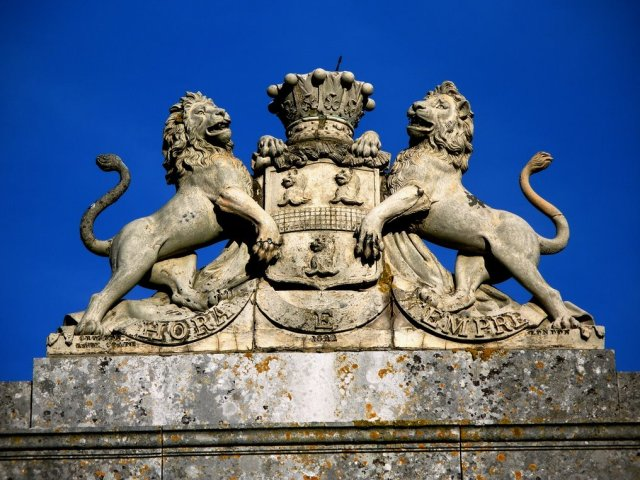
Easton Neston Gate at Towcester Race Course (detail). Coade stone crest, the Fermor arms, signed by William Croggon.
(See § Examples: Towcester/Easton Neston.)

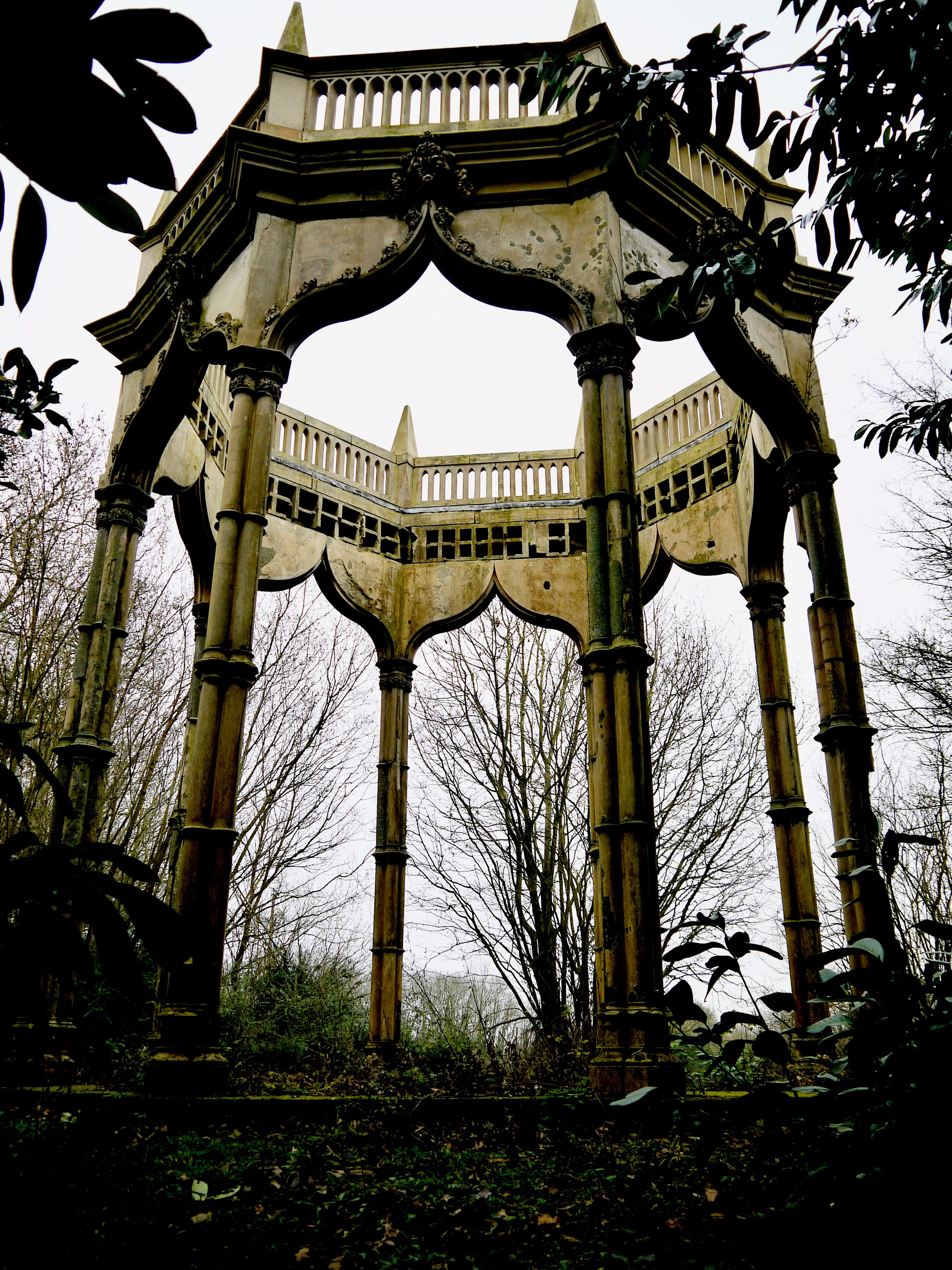
The Umbrello at Saxham Hall
(See § Examples: Saxham Hall, Umbrello.)

Queen Elizabeth I, model probably by John Bacon (sculptor, born 1740), Metropolitan Museum of Art, object id 2017.239

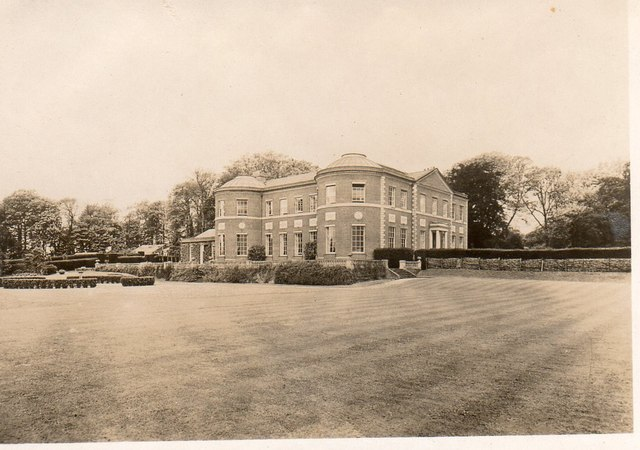
Herstmonceux Place, circa 1932. The south and east fronts by Samuel Wyatt in 1778. The white panels are Coade Stone.
(See § Examples: Herstmonceux Place.)

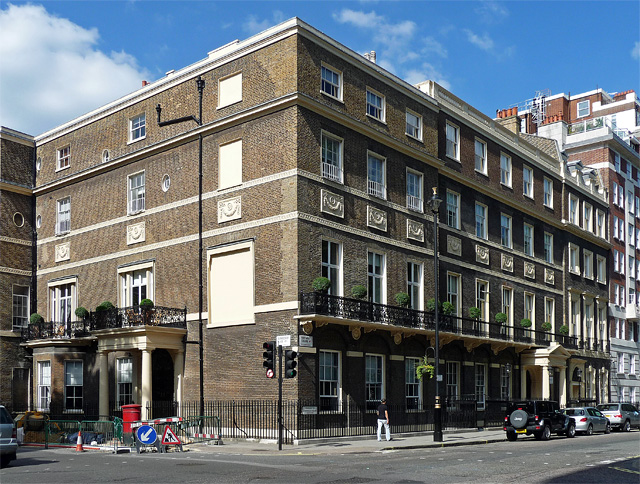
20–21 Portman Square, built by James and Samuel Wyatt. The white panels are Coade Stone.
(See § Examples: Portman Square.)

Keystone fountain mask circa 1780, ex collection Wendell_Cherry

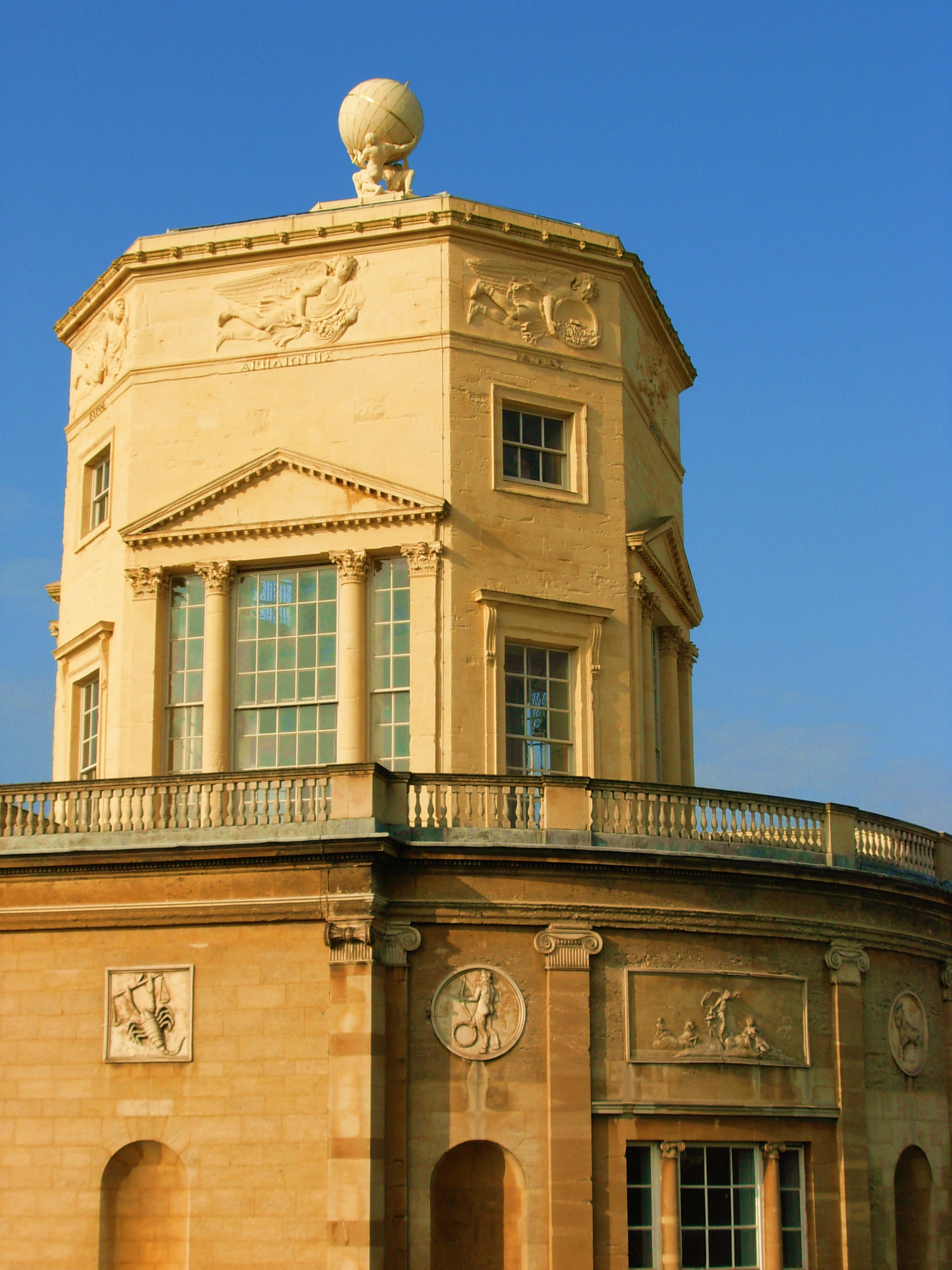
Radcliffe Observatory, Tower of the Winds, Oxford. The signs of the zodiac are Coade stone.
(See § Examples: Radcliffe Observatory.)

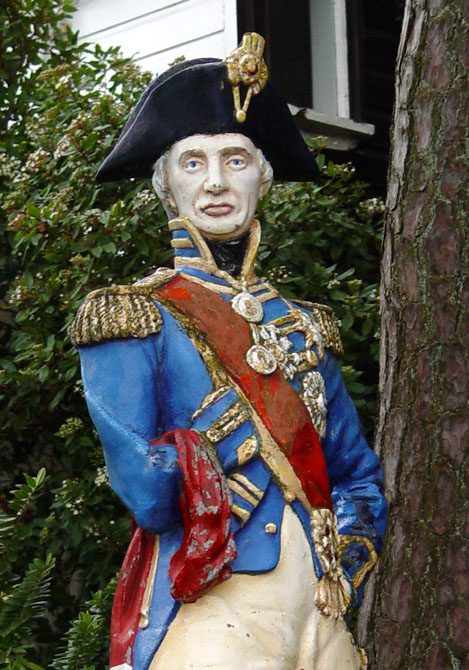
Grade II listed statue of Lord Nelson in Portmeirion, Wales
(See § Examples: Portmeirion, Lord Nelson.)

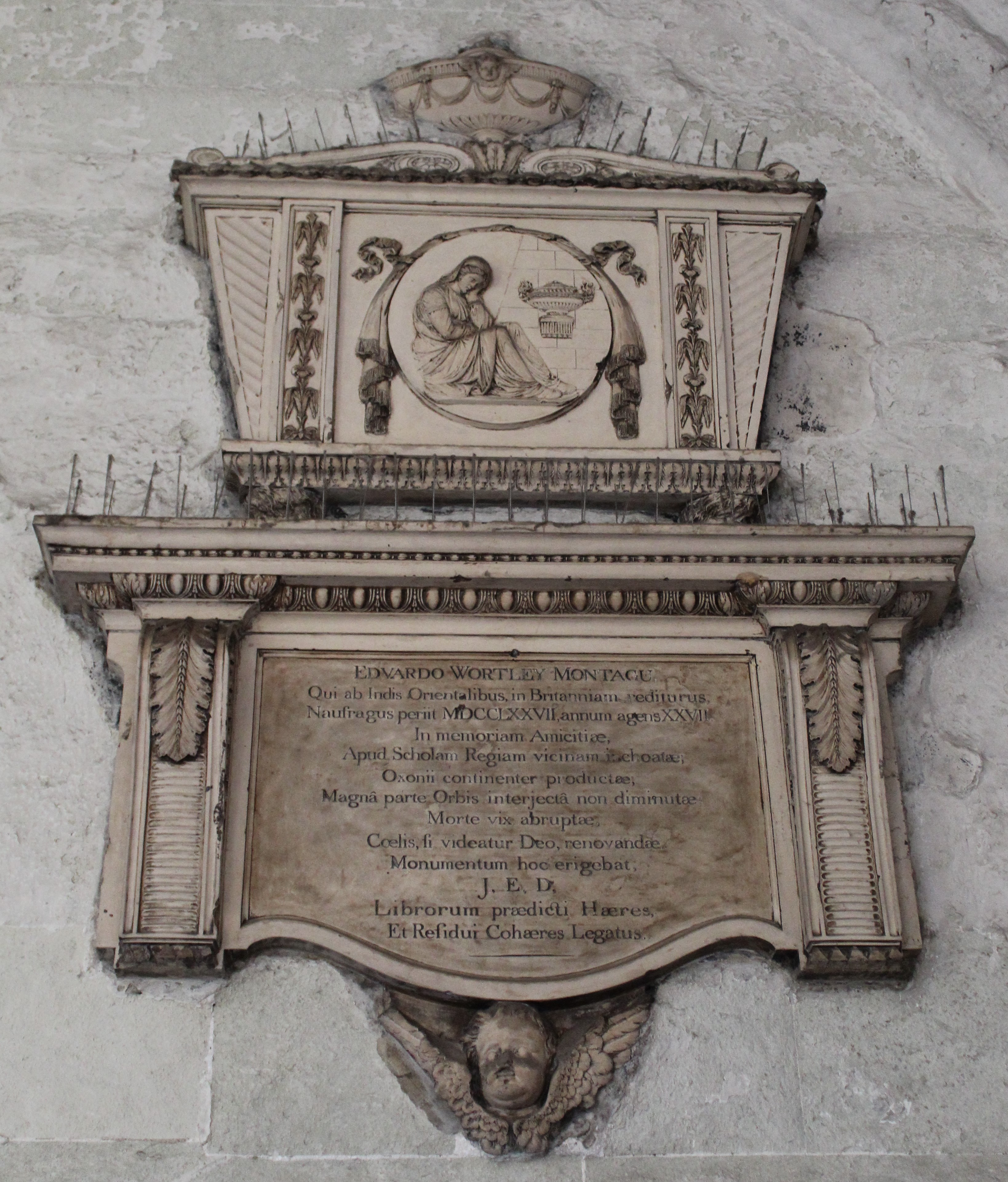
Westminster Abbey – Memorial to Edward Wortley Montagu (1750–1777) in the west cloister of the Abbey, London. Memorial, erected 1787, consists of an urn on a sarcophagus above an inscribed panel in Coade stone.

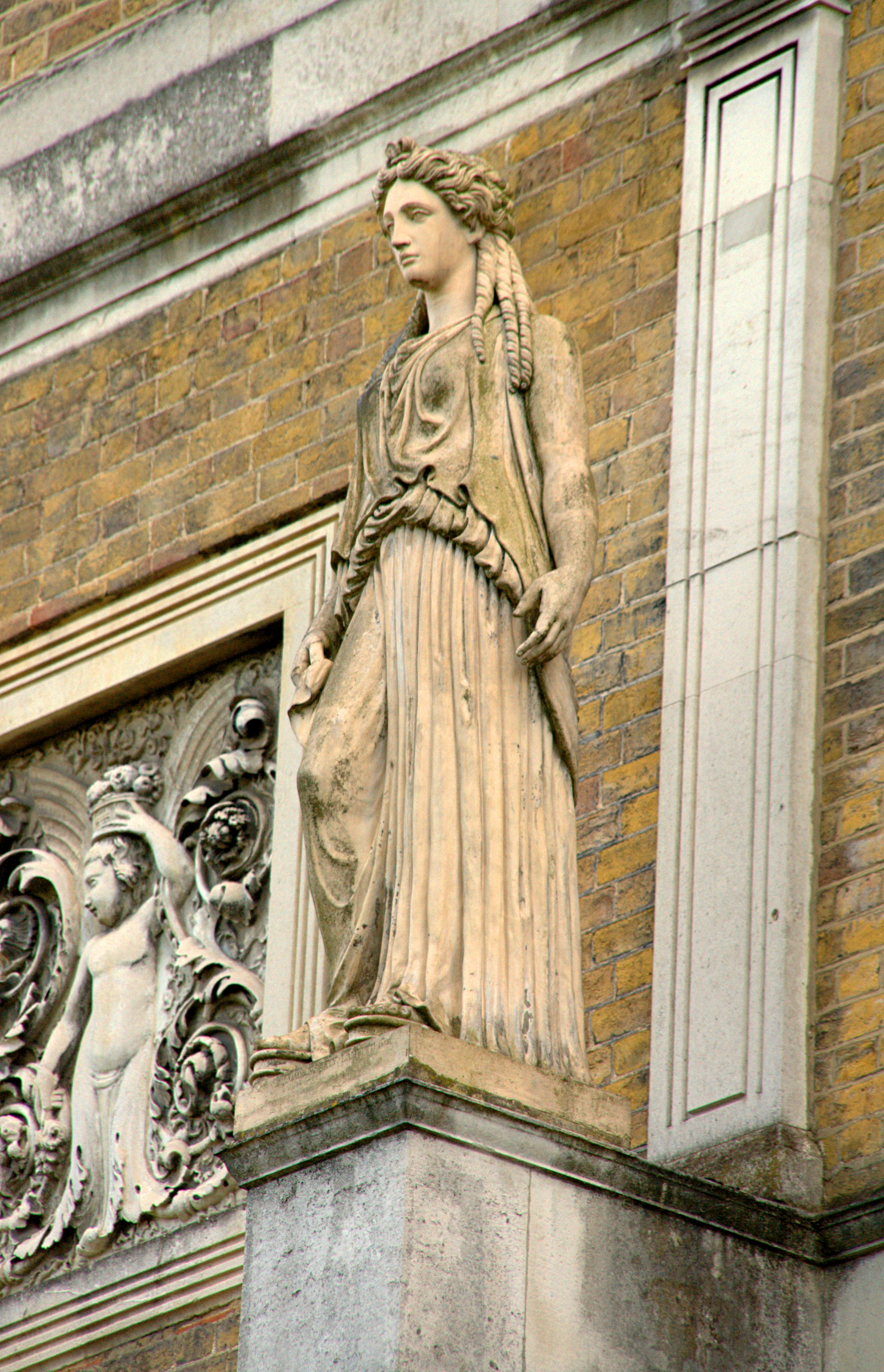
One of four caryatids on the east front of Pitzhanger Manor. Modelled on the sanctuary of Pandrosus, Athens.
(See § Examples: Pitzhanger Manor.)

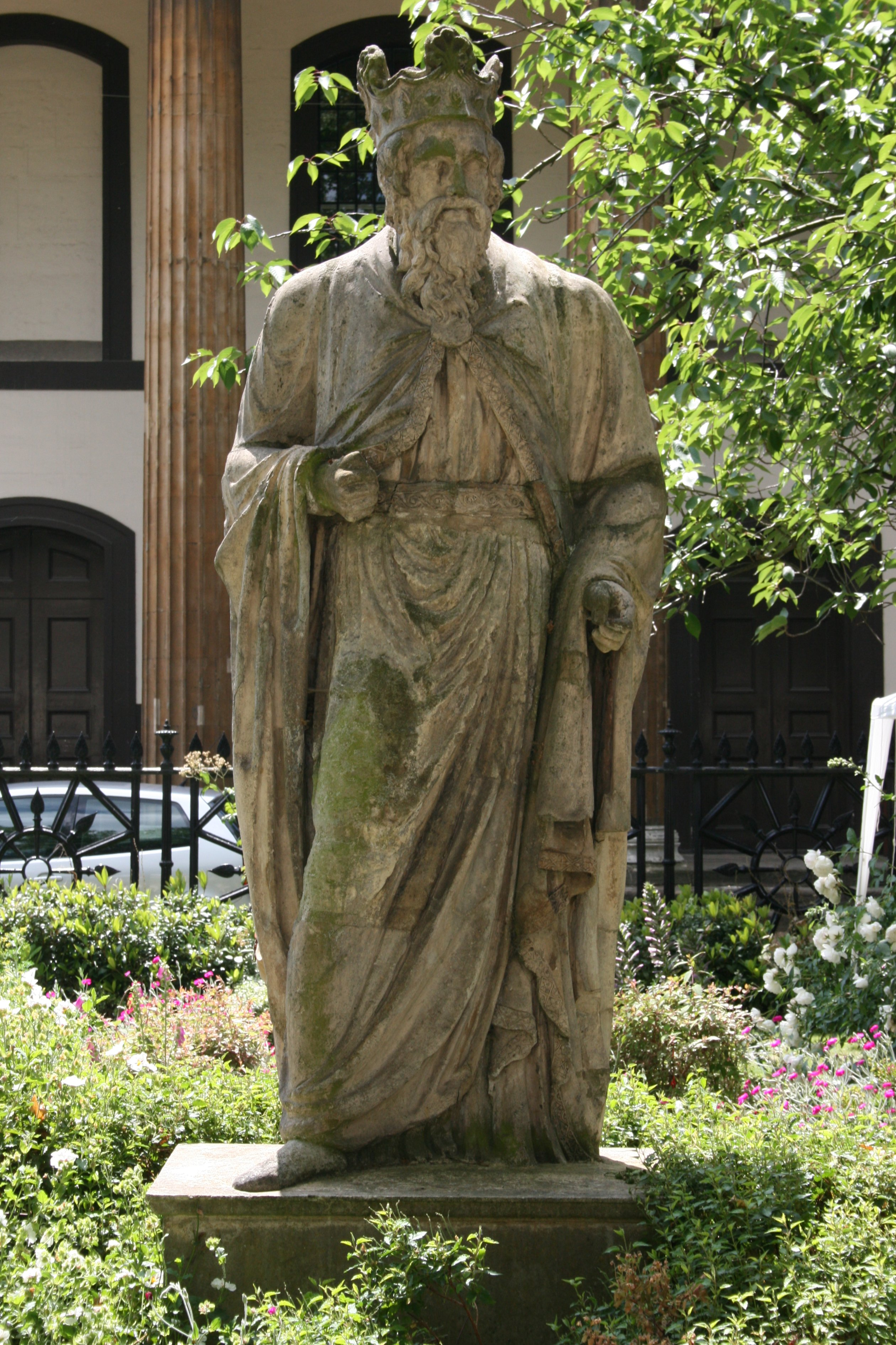
Statue of King Alfred the Great in Trinity Church Square, Southwark.
(See § Examples: King Alfred the Great, Southwark.)

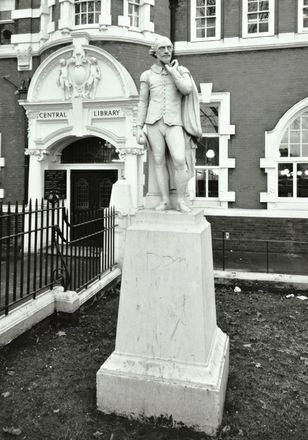
Statue of Shakespeare in Coade stone at University of East London.
(See § Examples: Shakespeare, University of East London.)

== Coade Ltd ==
Coade Ltd produces original stone castings and does reproduction work in workshops in Wilton, Wiltshire. It began business in 2000.

== See also ==
- Anthropic rock
- Baluster
- Cast stone
- Pulhamite
