= Listed buildings in Chester Castle parish =

Chester Castle is a civil parish in Cheshire West and Chester, England. It contains 16 buildings that are recorded in the National Heritage List for England as designated listed buildings. Of these, six are listed at Grade I, the highest of the three grades, and the others are at Grade II, the lowest grade. The parish contains the area occupied by Chester Castle and includes what is left of the castle, the buildings that replaced it, and walls surrounding it or close to it.

== Key ==
Grade	Criteria
I	Buildings of exceptional interest, sometimes considered to be internationally important
II*	Particularly important buildings of more than special interest
II	Buildings of national importance and special interest

== Buildings ==
Name and location	Photograph	Date	Notes	Grade
Agricola Tower; 53.18539°N 2.89214°W		Late 12th century	This was the gatehouse to the inner bailey of the castle. It is built in sandstone and has three storeys, with an embattled parapet and a metal roof. The tower was refaced in 1818 by Thomas Harrison. The middle floor contains the Chapel of St Mary de Castro, which has fragments of medieval wall paintings. In the ground floor is a gateway with a pointed arch and a rectangular window, and above the gateway is a lancet window. On the corners are turrets and buttresses.	I
Curtain wall to west and southwest of inner bailey 53.18532°N 2.89297°W		After 1246	Additions were made to the wall, which is in sandstone, in the 18th, 19th and 20th centuries. At the left end is the Halfmoon Tower, with a semicircular plan, two tiers of sash windows, and a battlemented parapet. The wall extends to the right, also with a battlemented parapet, to the corner where there are three buttresses. At the rear are stairways leading up to a walkway, and the two-storey Flag Tower projecting at the centre. To the right of this is a 19th-century house, stuccoed, in two storeys, with a three-bay front, a central bowed oriel window, and sash windows.	I
Wall railings and gate, St Mary's Churchyard; 53.18637°N 2.89156°W	—	Medieval	The walls surrounding the churchyard of St. Mary's Church are the oldest part, the gate and railings dating from the 19th century. The wall is mainly in sandstone with some repairs in brick, and stands partly on bedrock. It is buttressed in places. The gate piers are in stone and the railings and gates are in iron.	II
Curtain wall to east of inner bailey 53.18522°N 2.89206°W	—	Late 18th century	The curtain wall is in sandstone and has a battlemented parapet with keel moulding below. Along the wall are buttresses, and at the rear is a raised walkway.	II
Curtain wall to south of inner bailey 53.18505°N 2.89269°W		1786	Built in sandstone, this consists of a central wall facing south and two lateral walls with rusticated quoins at the corners. On the top is roll moulding and a battlemented parapet, and at the back is a raised walkway.	II
Assize Courts Block; 53.18593°N 2.89194°W		1788–1801	A block containing law courts and offices designed by Thomas Harrison. It is built in sandstone with a slate roof, is in two storeys at the front and four storeys at the rear, and has a slate roof. The main front is symmetrical with 19 bays, the central seven bays projecting forward and containing a portico with two rows of six monolithic columns in Greek Doric style. Inside is the Shire Hall (Court No. 1) with a semi-dome lit by a skylight. Court No. 2 was added in 1875–76, designed by T. M. Lockwood.	I
B Block; 53.18560°N 2.89265°W		1804	An armoury designed by Thomas Harrison, later used as the officers' mess. It is built in sandstone with a slate roof, is in two storeys, and has a front of nine bays. Between the bays and at the ends are Greek Doric half-monolithic columns, and at the top of the block is a plain entablature with a parapet. In the centre is a double doorway with two fanlights and surmounted by a pediment carried on fluted consoles. The windows are sashes, those on the ground floor having architraves, and on the left of the building is an archway linking it with the Assize Court Block.	I
Wall and railings from St Mary's Hill; 53.18646°N 2.89162°W	—	1804	The wall and railings were designed by Thomas Harrison by the path giving access to Castle Square from St Mary's Hill. It is in sandstone and the railing is iron. At the east end is a pineapple finial.	II
A Block; 53.18646°N 2.89204°W		1810	Barracks and Court of Exchequer designed by Thomas Harrison, later used as the Cheshire Military Museum. It is built in sandstone with a slate roof, is in two storeys, and forms three sides of a courtyard. The main front is in nine bays. Between the bays and at the ends are Greek Doric half-monolithic columns, and at the top of the block is a plain entablature with a parapet. In the centre is a double doorway with two fanlights and surmounted by a pediment carried on fluted consoles. The windows are sashes, those on the ground floor having architraves, and on the right of the building is an archway linking it with the Assize Court Block.	I
Provost; 53.18678°N 2.89179°W	—	1810	This was built as a military gaol, it was designed by Thomas Harrison, and is sited behind Block A. It is constructed in sandstone and has a slate roof. The building is in two storeys, and consists of a central bay with a wing on each side at an angle of about 45 degrees. There is a central doorway, and the windows are sashes with ventilation grills between them.	II
Propylaea; 53.18630°N 2.89334°W		1811–13	This forms the entrance to Castle Square and consists of a gateway flanked by pavilions. It was designed by Thomas Harrison in Neoclassical style. On the west front are two rows of four monolithic columns in Greek Doric style with a Doric entablature above, and there are four similar columns on the east front of the gateway, and on the porticos of the pavilions.	I
Retaining walls to forecourt 53.18655°N 2.89289°W	—	c. 1811–13	Designed by Thomas Harrison, these consist of two quarter-circular walls flanking the entrance to Castle Square. They are in stone, and have rectangular piers at intervals. Between the piers are decorative cast iron railings.	II
Napier House; 53.18514°N 2.89245°W		1830	This was built on the south side of the inner bailey of the castle as an armoury and barracks, and has later been used as offices. It is constructed in sandstone with a slate roof, is in three storeys and has a north front of eleven bays. In the centre of the ground floor is a door with a moulded surround. At the top of the building is an entablature with a plain parapet containing a raised panel in the centre. The windows are sashes.	II
Retaining wall, River Dee; 53.18460°N 2.89171°W	—	c. 1830	The south side of the wall faces the River Dee, is about 15 courses high, and is surmounted by a roll-mould. On the other side, the walkway is level with the mould. The wall has a parapet of stone slabs. It was modified at the east end in about 1913 when the hydro-electric station was built.	II
Artillery Stores; 53.18518°N 2.89199°W	—	Mid-19th century	The artillery stores on the east side of the inner bailey, built in sandstone, have later been used as a general store. The former gun store is in two storeys with five arched entrances and sash windows above. To the left is a recessed two-storey single-bay with a sash window in the upper floor and a casement window below. To the left of this is a single-storey four-bay section with casements and a battlemented parapet. To the left of this is a 20th-century extension.	II
Statue of Queen Victoria; 53.18604°N 2.89233°W		1903	The statue, designed by F. W. Pomeroy, stands in a central position in Chester Square. The statue is in bronze, and depicts Queen Victoria standing, dressed in coronation robes, and holding the orb and sceptre. This is placed on a pedestal of Stancliffe stone and a base of granite, and on the sides of the pedestal are the arms of the city and the county.	II
