= Chester Crown Court =

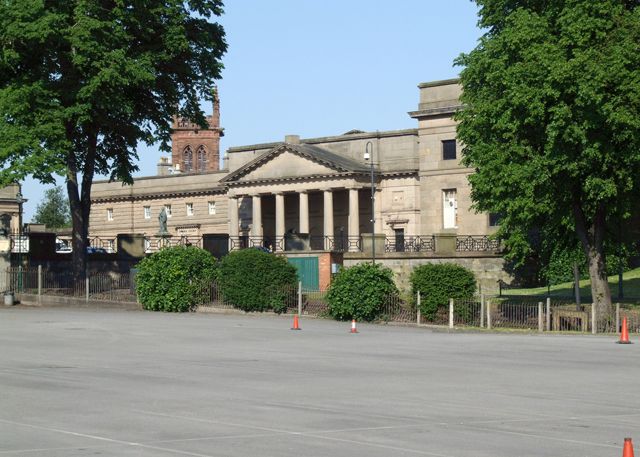

- Location within Cheshire
- 53.1858°N 2.8918°W
- Location: Chester, Cheshire

History
- Built: 1801

Site notes
- Architect: Thomas Harrison

Listed Building – Grade I
- Official name: Assize Courts Block, Castle Square
- Designated: 1 June 1967
- Reference no.: 1271823

Chester Crown Court is a judicial facility at Castle Square in Chester, Cheshire, England. The building, which forms part of a series of imposing buildings at Chester Castle, is a Grade I listed building.

== History ==
The current building replaced a previous shire hall which had been built just outside the main gate in 1310, but which was in a derelict state by the late 18th century. In 1785 the justices insisted that an architectural competition be held for a new shire hall as well as a new prison to be located behind the new shire hall; the site selected for the new complex formed part of the outer bailey of the castle.

Work on the new complex began with the demolition of the old buildings in 1788. The new shire hall was designed by Thomas Harrison and completed in 1801. The design involved a symmetrical main frontage with nineteen bays facing onto Castle Square with the end bays projecting forwards slightly; the central section of seven bays featured a large hexastyle portico with twelve Doric order columns (in two rows), projecting forwards by about 10 feet (3 m) with a plain tympanum above. Its two-storey façade was about 250 feet (76 m) long and 25 feet (8 m) high. Internally, the principal room was an imposing main courtroom which was inspired by the School of Anatomy in Paris. It was described by Charles Dupin as "most assuredly the handsomest of this kind that is to be seen in Europe." The prison, which Harrison had also designed and which had been located behind the shire hall, was demolished in 1902.

A statue of Queen Victoria, designed by Frederick William Pomeroy, was unveiled outside the share hall by the Lord Lieutenant of Cheshire, Wilbraham Egerton, 1st Earl Egerton, on 17 October 1903.

The building was used as a facility for dispensing justice from the early 19th century and was latterly used as a Crown Court. Famous trials at the court have included those of Ian Brady and Myra Hindley, known as the Moors Murderers, in April 1966. Bulletproof glass was erected around the dock to ensure the two defendants were protected during the trial. The court was also the venue for the trial of Peter Reyn-Bardt, accused of murdering his estranged wife, Malika de Fernandez in December 1983; Reyn-Bardt was convicted based on his confession even though the human remains which had been dug up and which had led to his arrest were subsequently dated to the Roman period. The court also saw the trial and conviction of Howard Hughes for the murder of Sophie Hook in June 1996.

== See also ==
- Grade I listed buildings in Cheshire West and Chester
- Chester Castle
