= Statue of Queen Victoria, Chester =

Statue in Chester, England

Coordinates: 53.18603°N 2.89232°W

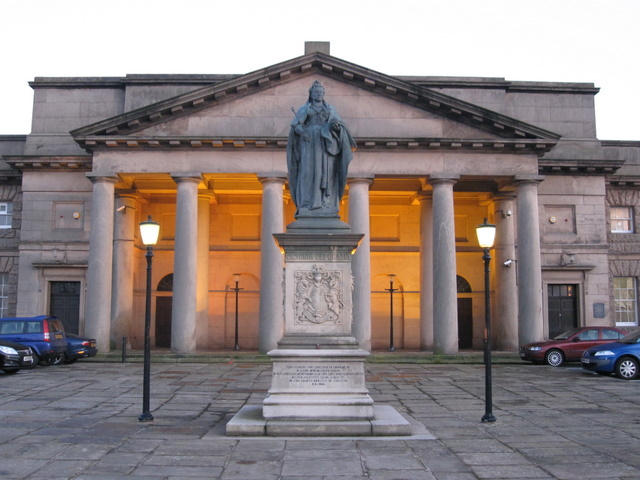
Statue of Queen Victoria in front of Chester Castle

The Statue of Queen Victoria stands in front of Chester Crown Court in the forecourt of Chester Castle, Chester, Cheshire, England. It was unveiled in 1903, the sculptor was Frederick William Pomeroy, and the statue is recorded in the National Heritage List for England as a designated Grade II listed building.

== History ==
The money for the statue was raised by public subscription, with about one-third being raised in the city of Chester, and the remaining amount from elsewhere in the county. Its total cost was £1,360 (equivalent to £180,000 as of 2023), excluding the cost of the foundations. Frederick William Pomeroy was selected to be the sculptor; he had recently created the effigy of the Duke of Westminster in Chester Cathedral. The bronze statue was made in the foundry of Hollinshead and Burton in Thames Ditton, Surrey. The designer of the stonework was Harry Beswick, and the stonemasons were Haswell and Sons of Chester. The statue was unveiled on 17 October 1903 by Wilbraham Egerton, 1st Earl Egerton.

== Description ==
The statue is in bronze, and depicts Queen Victoria standing, and holding the orb and sceptre. The Queen is dressed in coronation robes, wearing a lace head-dress and the Imperial crown. The figure stands on a pedestal of Stancliffe stone and a base of granite. The figure is about 1.65 metres (5.4 ft) high, and the pedestal is about 1.70 metres (5.6 ft) in height. On the sides of the pedestal are the arms of the city and the county. On the north side of the granite base is an inscription in lead reading as follows.

THIS STATUE WAS ERECTED IN HONOUR OF
A GOOD AND BELOVED QUEEN
AND IN GRATEFUL REMEMBRANCE OF HER LONG AND GLORIOUS REIGN
BY HER MAJESTY'S LOYAL SUBJECTS
IN THE COUNTY AND CITY OF CHESTER A.D. 1903

In relief, around the sides of the pedestal, is an inscription reading as follows.

VICTORIA. DEI. GRATIA.
MAG. BRIT. ET. HIBERN.
REG. FIDEI DEFENSOR.
??? 1837–1901. INDIA. IMP.

On the west base of the statue is the signature of the sculptor, reading "FW POMEROY / SCULPTOR. 1903".

The statue was designated as a Grade II listed building on 26 February 1985. Grade II is the lowest of the three grades of listing and is applied to "buildings of national importance and special interest".

== See also ==
- Listed buildings in Chester Castle parish
