= The Downfall of William Grismond =

English broadside ballad

The Downfall of William Grismond is an English broadside ballad from the 17th century, also known as William Grismond's Downfall. William Grismond, the narrator, sings the song as a warning to other men. He lied to a woman in order to satisfy his lust, and then killed her when she became pregnant. For this, he must die, and he warns other men not to do the same as him. Sung to the tune of Where is My Love? Copies of the ballad can be found in the National Library of Scotland, the British Library, and the University of Glasgow Library. On-line facsimile transcriptions are also available for public consumption.

== Synopsis ==
The ballad begins with William Grismond calling all young men to hear his story. He lived at Lainterdine, where he lied to his neighbor's daughter in order to satisfy his lust. He promised her marriage, but he was rich and she was poor, and he knew his parents would never agree to marriage. He had the opportunity to marry a rich woman, and now that he had satisfied his lust, he was no longer interested in the neighbor's daughter. She, however, becomes pregnant, and tells him that if he doesn't marry her, she will be ruined. He takes her into a broom field and slits her throat with a knife. The neighbors finally find her corpse after three days, at which point he tries to flee to Ireland. After setting sail, however, his ship turns around because they know somebody wicked is on board. They take him to Westchester and put in Chester prison. Later, he is taken to Heriford to answer for his sins. His father offers all of his gold to save him, but his deed was too heinous, and he must be made an example of. Finally, Grismond tells us that his father brought him up well and he is sorry for disappointing his family. He repents of his wrongs and once again reiterates his warning to other young men not to do what he has done.

== Criticism ==
David Atkinson, David Gregory, and Tom Pettitt read The Downfall of William Grismond as one of the primary examples of what are called "murdered sweetheart ballad". Pettitt points to the ballad's claim to be based on a real court case, the murderer's opportunity to marry another, and the public's love of both murderous details and the prevailing of justice. He also traces the ballad forward into the Irish and Scottish folk traditions, showing how the transition from ballad to folk song involves a simplification of the narrative.
