= Burton upon Trent Town Hall =

Municipal building in Burton upon Trent, Staffordshire, England

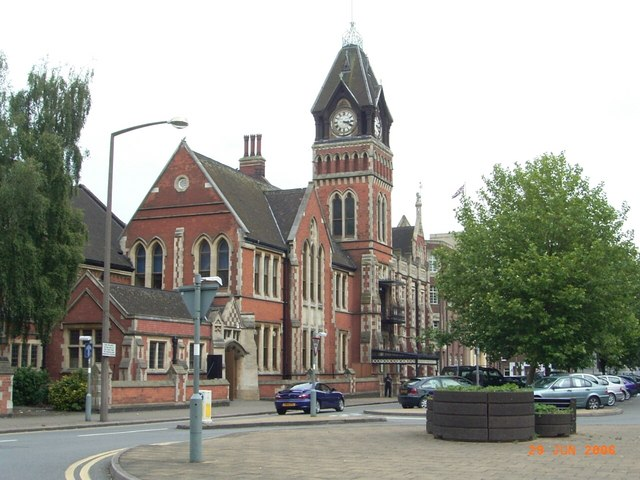
- Burton upon Trent Town Hall

- Shown in Staffordshire
- 52.8080°N 1.6454°W
- Location: King Edward Place, Burton upon Trent

History
- Built: 1878

Site notes
- Architect: Reginald Churchill
- Architectural style: Victorian Gothic style

Listed Building – Grade II
- Designated: 22 June 1979
- Reference no.: 1038703

Burton upon Trent Town Hall is a municipal building in King Edward Place, Burton upon Trent, Staffordshire, England. It is a Grade II listed building.

== History ==
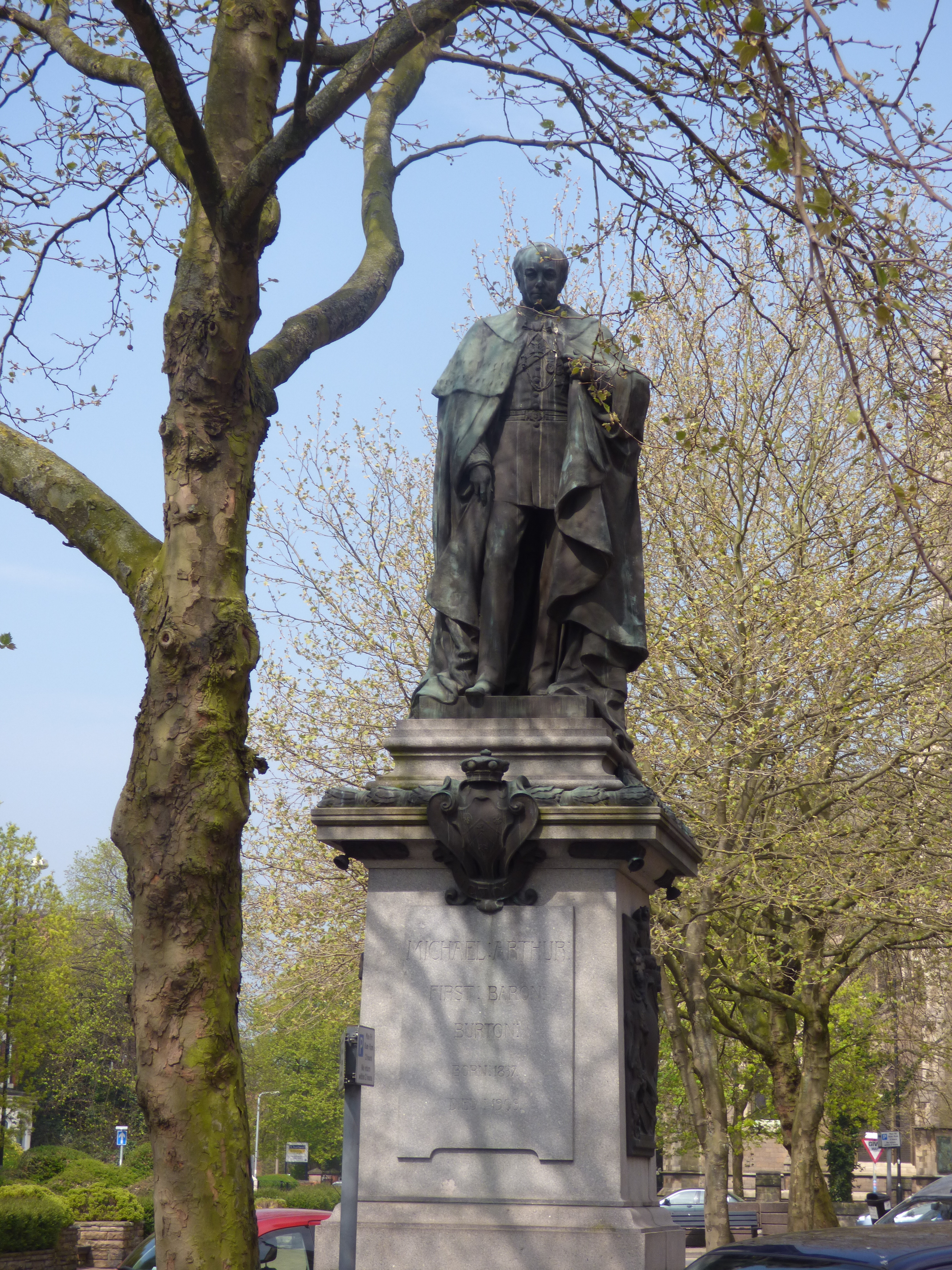
Statue of Michael Bass, 1st Baron Burton in front of the Town Hall

=== The building ===
In the mid 19th century local council meetings were held in the old Town Hall in the Market Square: this was a building which was commissioned by the lord of the manor, Lord Paget. It had been designed in the classical style, possibly by James Wyatt, and completed in 1772. (Note: The old Town Hall was demolished in 1884.)

The current building, which was designed by Reginald Churchill in a Victorian Gothic style, was commissioned by Michael Thomas Bass for use as the St Paul's Institute and the Liberal Club and completed in 1878. Bass' son, Michael Arthur Bass, donated the building to the town in 1891 and it was extended, by the inclusion of purpose-built municipal offices, a council chamber, a concert hall and a new staircase, in 1894. The prominent clock tower was also added at this time, containing a Cambridge-chiming clock by John Smith & Sons of Derby and five bells by Taylor of Loughborough. A statue by F. W. Pomeroy of Michael Arthur Bass (by then Lord Burton) was erected in the square in front of the building in 1911. A further large extension, designed by George Moncur, the borough surveyor, in the Art Deco style was built to the southeast of the main building and completed in 1939.

During the First World War, the town hall was used as a Red Cross Voluntary Aid Detachment auxiliary hospital. In the entrance lobby are four large wooden plaques, listing the names of the men of the County Borough of Burton who gave their lives in each world war. Queen Elizabeth II, accompanied by the Duke of Edinburgh, visited the town hall and waved to the crowd from the town hall balcony on 28 March 1957.

The new town hall initially became the headquarters of Burton upon Trent municipal borough, which was raised to being a county borough in 1901. A four-storey Art Deco extension was added to the east of the building in 1939, on the corner with Waterloo Street. The borough's coat of arms is carved into the stonework above the main entrance of the extension, which was formally opened by the mayor on 6 October 1939. Since 1974 the building has been the headquarters of East Staffordshire Borough Council.

=== Organs ===
The hall boasts a Wurlitzer organ, which had originally been installed at the Cameo Theatre in Cleveland, Ohio in 1925; after a fire in the theatre it was repossessed by its manufacturer before being installed at the Forum Cinema in Northenden, Manchester, in 1934 and then being moved to Burton Town Hall in 1973. In 1995 OS Digital Recordings released a recording from Burton upon Trent Town Hall entitled Come Dancing which involved excerpts of music performed by Arnold Loxam on the organ. An earlier Kirkland organ was added to the St Paul's Institute in 1880 and expanded by Norman and Beard in 1906.
