= Thomas Harrison (architect) =

English architect (1744–1829)

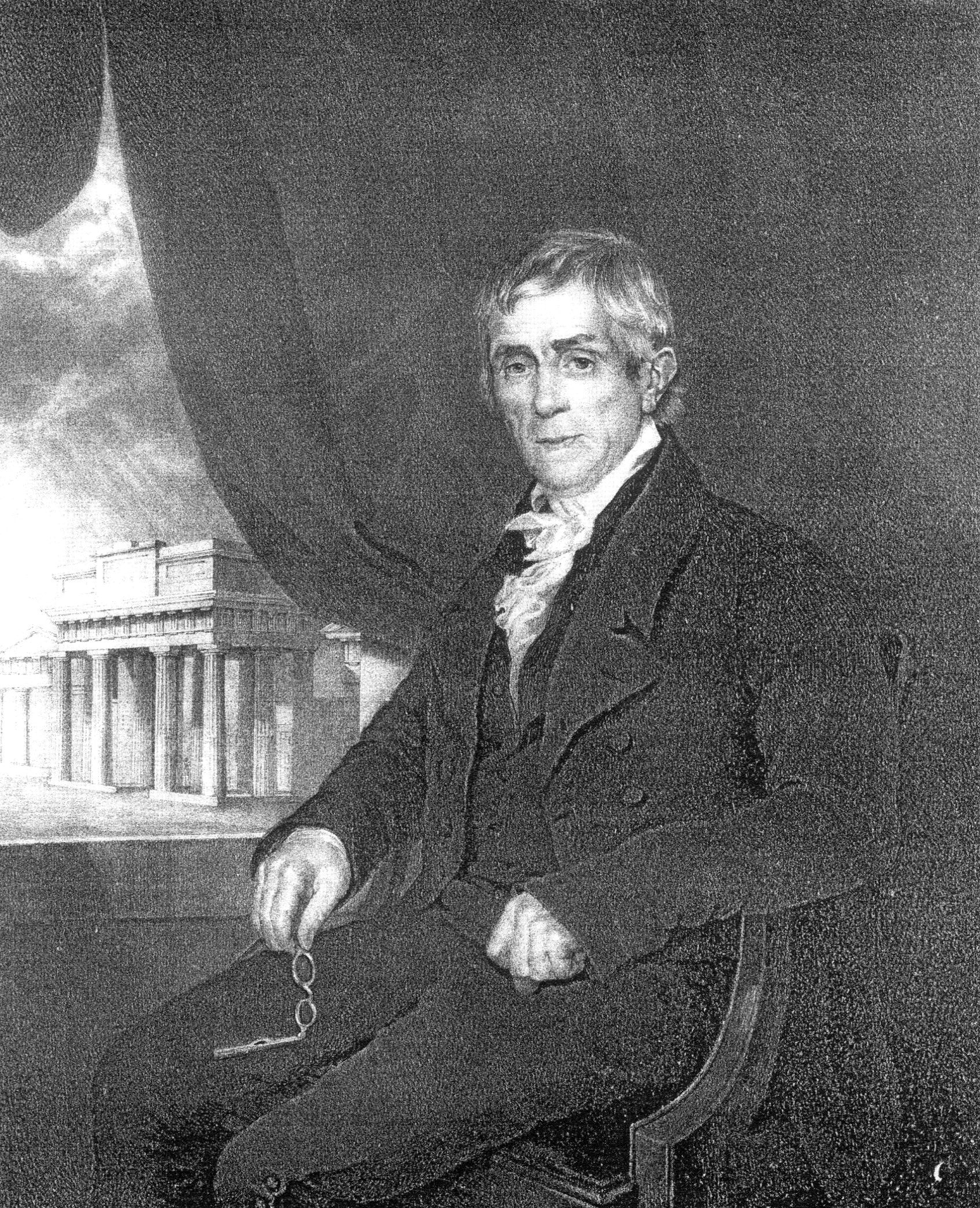
- Portrait of Harrison by H. Wyatt dated 1820
- Born: 7 August 1744 (baptised); Richmond, North Yorkshire, England
- Died: 29 March 1829 (aged 84); Chester, Cheshire, England
- Resting place: St Bridget's Church, Chester (later Blacon Cemetery)
- Occupations: Architect; bridge engineer
- Known for: Skerton Bridge, Lancaster, Grosvenor Bridge, Chester, Lancaster Castle, Chester Castle
- Spouse: Margaret Shackleton
- Parent: Thomas Harrison

Thomas Harrison (7 August (baptised) 1744 – 29 March 1829) was an English architect and bridge engineer who trained in Rome, where he studied classical architecture. Returning to England, he won the competition in 1782 for the design of Skerton Bridge in Lancaster. After moving to Lancaster he worked on local buildings, received commissions for further bridges, and designed country houses in Scotland. In 1786 Harrison was asked to design new buildings within the grounds of Lancaster and Chester castles, projects that occupied him, together with other works, until 1815. On both sites he created accommodation for prisoners, law courts, and a shire hall, while working on various other public buildings, gentlemen's clubs, churches, houses, and monuments elsewhere. His final major commission was for the design of Grosvenor Bridge in Chester.

Some of Harrison's designs, including his buildings at Lancaster Castle, were Gothic in style, but most were Neoclassical, particularly those at Chester Castle. He was regarded at the time, and since, as a major influence in the emergence of the Greek Revival in British architecture. A bridge he designed at the start of his career, and another towards the end of his career, incorporated innovative features; Skerton Bridge was the first substantial bridge in England to have a flat roadway, and the Grosvenor Bridge was the longest single-arched masonry bridge in the world at the time of its construction. Many of Harrison's structures have survived, most of them now designated by English Heritage as listed buildings. Despite his work being nationally admired he spent his entire career in northwest England, visiting London only occasionally; most of his buildings were in Lancashire, Cheshire, and the nearby counties.

== Early life and training ==
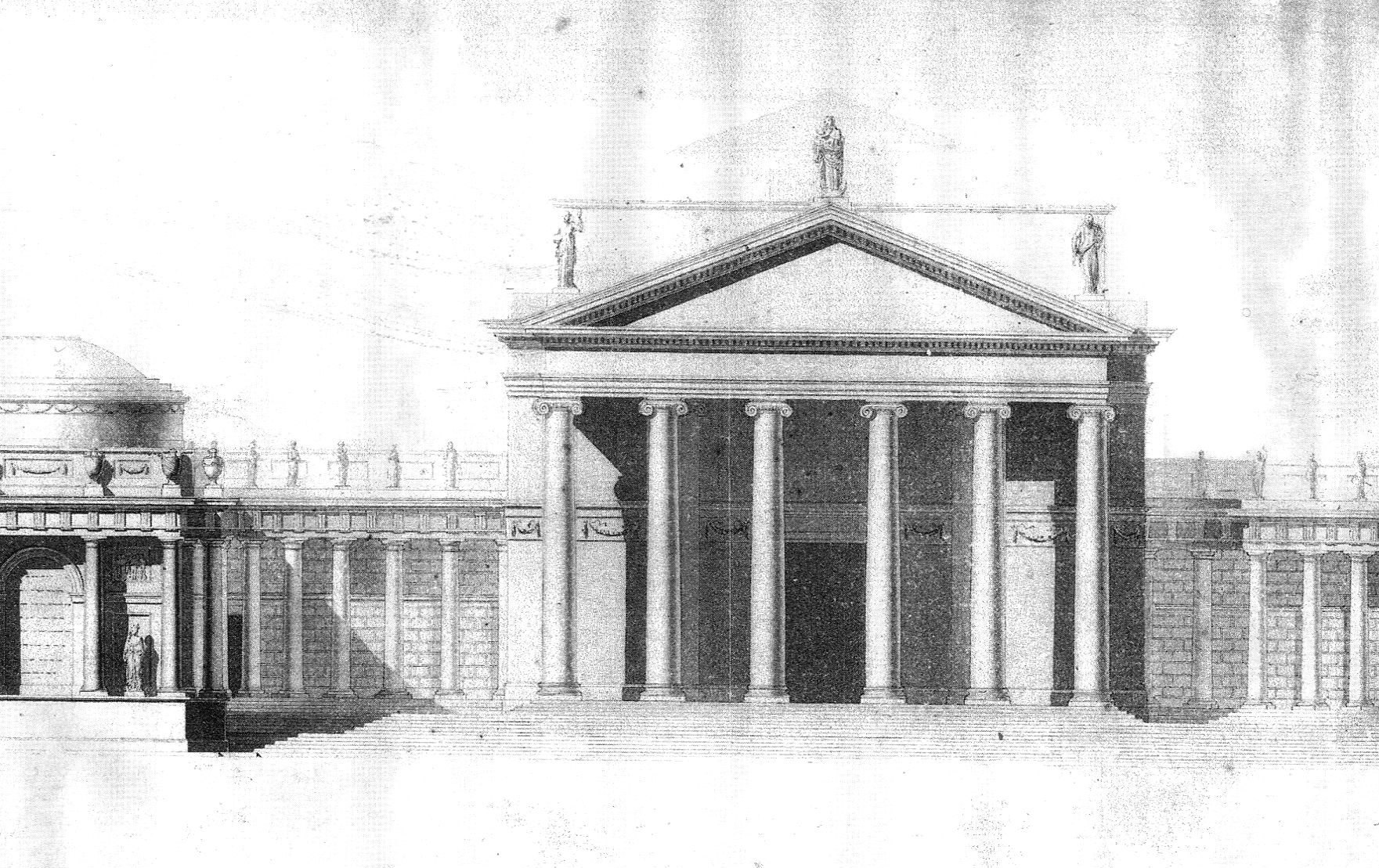
Harrison's design for the Piazza del Popolo, Rome

Thomas Harrison was born in Richmond, Yorkshire, England, the son of a joiner, also named Thomas. His precise date of birth is not known, but it is likely that he was baptised on 7 August 1744. Little is known about his early life, other than he attended Richmond Grammar School, and it is presumed that he worked with his father. In 1769 he was sponsored by a local landowner, Sir Lawrence Dundas of Aske Hall, to join George Cuitt (who later became a landscape painter) to study in Rome. Here he studied at the Accademia di San Luca, and during his seven years in Rome, amongst other activities, made drawings of Roman structures, including temples and Trajan's Column. In 1770 Harrison submitted a design to Pope Clement XIV for converting the Vatican Cortile del Belvedere into a museum for antique statues. This was "favourably received but not in the end adopted". Three years later he entered the Accademia's competition to re-plan the Piazza del Popolo. His design was unsuccessful, but it was exhibited at the Royal Academy in 1777. Following the failure of this design to be accepted, he petitioned the pope, and was awarded gold and silver medals, and made Accademico di Merito. He was then commissioned by the pope to alter the sacristy of St Peter's, but the pope died before the work started. Harrison returned to England in 1776, probably via France, as he made drawings of buildings in Nîmes and Paris. He produced designs for a bridge and a road in London, which were not accepted, and he returned to Richmond in 1778. (Note: Some of Harrison's drawings and plans are held in the Cheshire Record Office, including that of Trajan's Column, together with his design for the Piazza del Popolo, and drawings of buildings in France.)

== Works ==
=== Bridges ===
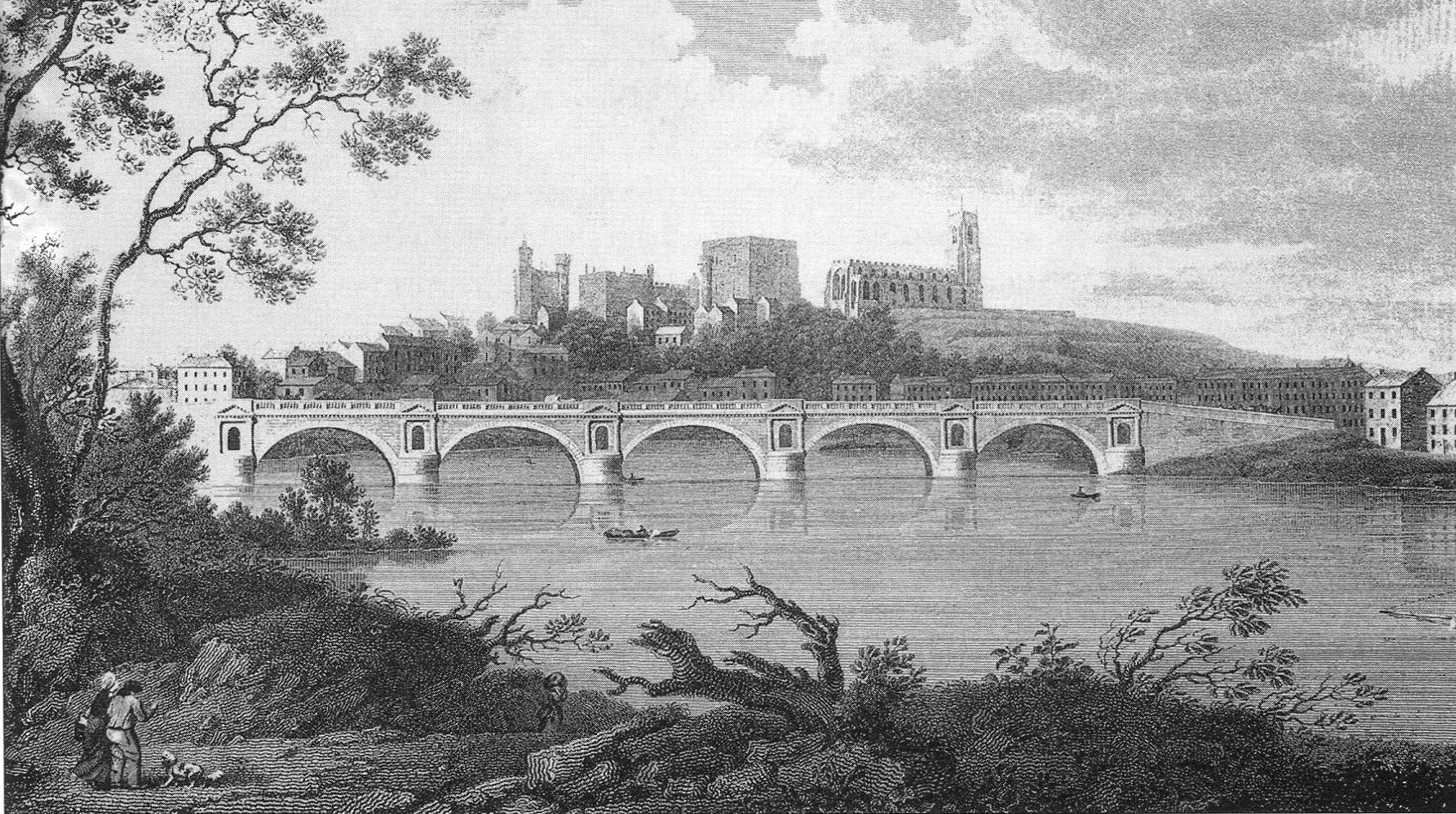
Engraving of Skerton Bridge by John Landseer, dated 1791

The major works executed by Harrison at the start and end of his career were bridges: Skerton Bridge in Lancaster and Grosvenor Bridge in Chester, both of which incorporated innovative features. In 1782 he won the first prize in a competition to design a bridge to cross the River Lune at Lancaster and to replace a medieval bridge. After some amendments to the design, the foundation stone was laid in June 1783, and Skerton Bridge was completed in September 1787, at a cost of £14,000 (equivalent to £1,900,000 in 2025). The bridge was carried on five elliptical arches, and was the first in England to have a flat road surface. Harrison subsequently received further commissions for bridges, including St Mary's Bridge in Derby (1788–93), Harrington Bridge near Sawley, Derbyshire (1789–90), and Stramongate Bridge in Kendal, Cumbria (1791–94), followed by smaller bridges in Lancashire and Cheshire. He was appointed unofficially as the bridge master of Lancashire, and having carried out the duties of country surveyor for Cheshire since 1800, was officially appointed to the post in 1815. Harrison's later bridges in Cheshire included the Mersey Bridge at Warrington (1812–17), and Cranage Bridge near Holmes Chapel (1815–16). These were the only bridges he designed to be built in timber rather than in stone, and both have been replaced. They were the first bridges of their type to be built in England, and were his only bridges to be regarded as "failures". During his career, Harrison was consulted about the design of other bridges in the country.

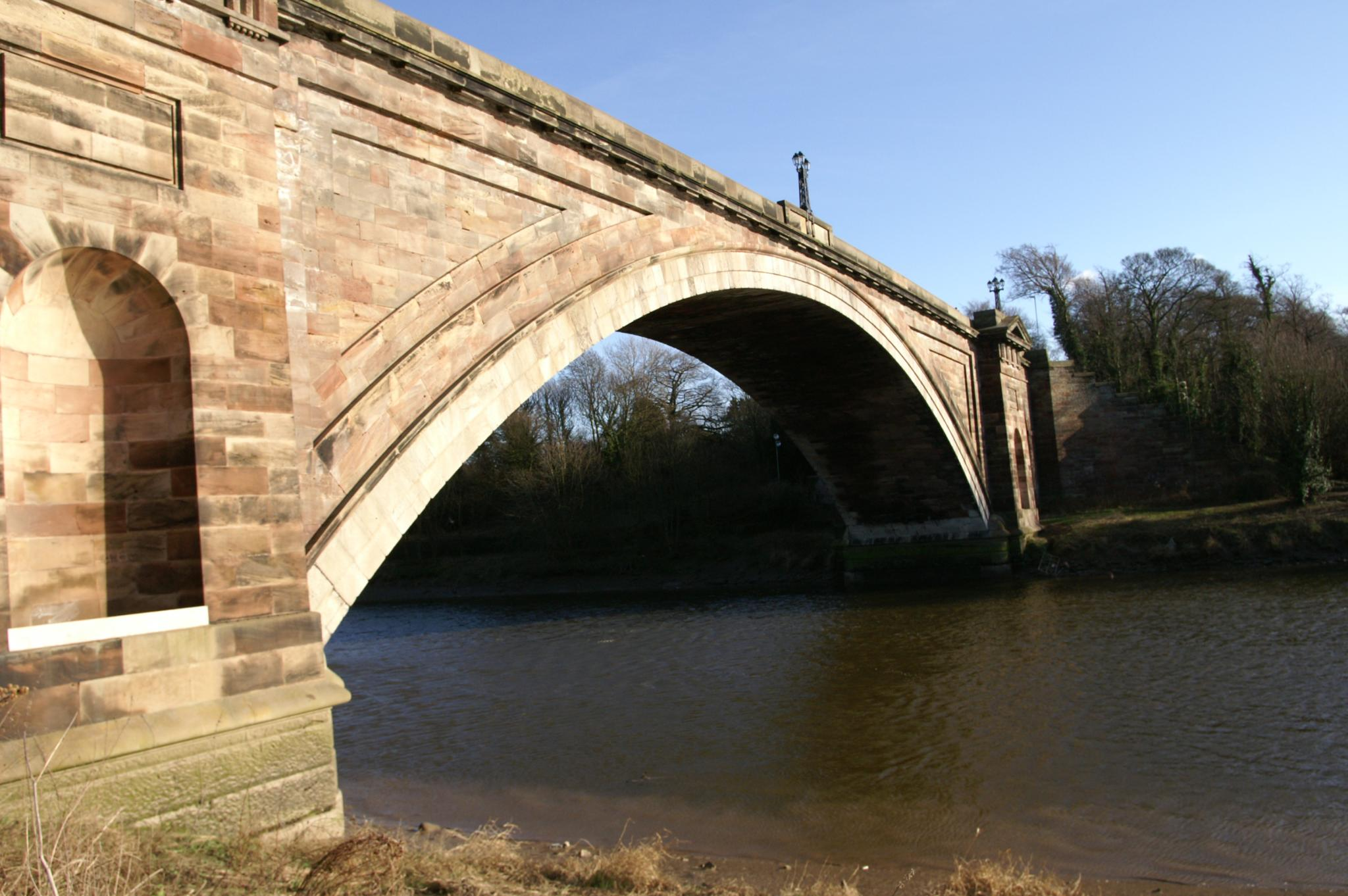
Grosvenor Bridge

Towards the end of his career, Harrison worked on two bridges in Chester. At the time the only road crossing over the River Dee was the medieval Old Dee Bridge, which was becoming inadequate for the increasing volume of traffic. In 1825 Harrison added three new arches on the upstream side of the bridge, and built a footway that was corbeled-out, also on the upstream side. Meanwhile, negotiations had been underway for a much more substantial bridge. In 1825 an Act of Parliament was passed for the Grosvenor Bridge to be built downstream from the Old Dee Bridge. To provide access to the new bridge, properties, including a church, had to be demolished, and Harrison was involved in designing the new approach to the bridge, which was named Grosvenor Street. He also prepared three different plans for the bridge, one in iron, the others in stone; one of the stone bridges had three arches, the other a single arch spanning 200 feet (61 m). The single-arch bridge would be the longest single-arch stone bridge in the world at the time, and there were doubts about its stability. Harrison's design was supported by the engineers James Trubshaw and John Rennie, and Trubshaw made a limestone model of the bridge to confirm its stability. (Note: The model is still in existence, and is on show in Castle Drive. The model has been listed by English Heritage at Grade II.) By this time Harrison was aged over 80, and in 1826 he resigned from the commission. Later that year the design was costed by Thomas Telford, and the town council subsequently accepted the design. Trubshaw was in charge of the construction, with Jesse Hartley as his clerk-of-works. The foundation stone was laid in 1827 by the Earl of Grosvenor (after whose family the bridge was named), and work began the following year. It was formally opened in 1832 by the future Queen Victoria, and traffic began to cross it the following year. The total cost of the bridge was just under £50,000 (equivalent to £5,100,000 in 2025). Harrison did not live to see it completed, as he died in 1829.

=== Lancaster and Chester Castles ===
Around the time that Harrison was involved in the construction of Skerton Bridge, he received other commissions for work in Lancaster. These included the addition of a clock tower to the Town Hall, the addition of a tower and spire to St John's Church, and the building of Bridge Houses on the east side of Skerton Bridge. In October 1786 Harrison was asked to prepare plans for substantial improvements to Lancaster Castle; in January that year he had also won the competition for major improvements to Chester Castle. He worked on both projects simultaneously for the next 30 years, and beyond that until 1815 in Chester, where he added further new buildings. In both projects he designed buildings for prisoners and prison staff, courtrooms and a Shire Hall. Both towns already had gaols, but there was a national move in the later part of the 18th century to improve them, following the campaigns by penal formers led by John Howard. Amongst these reforms were the separation of men and women, and of criminals and debtors, which were incorporated into Harrison's designs.

==== Lancaster ====
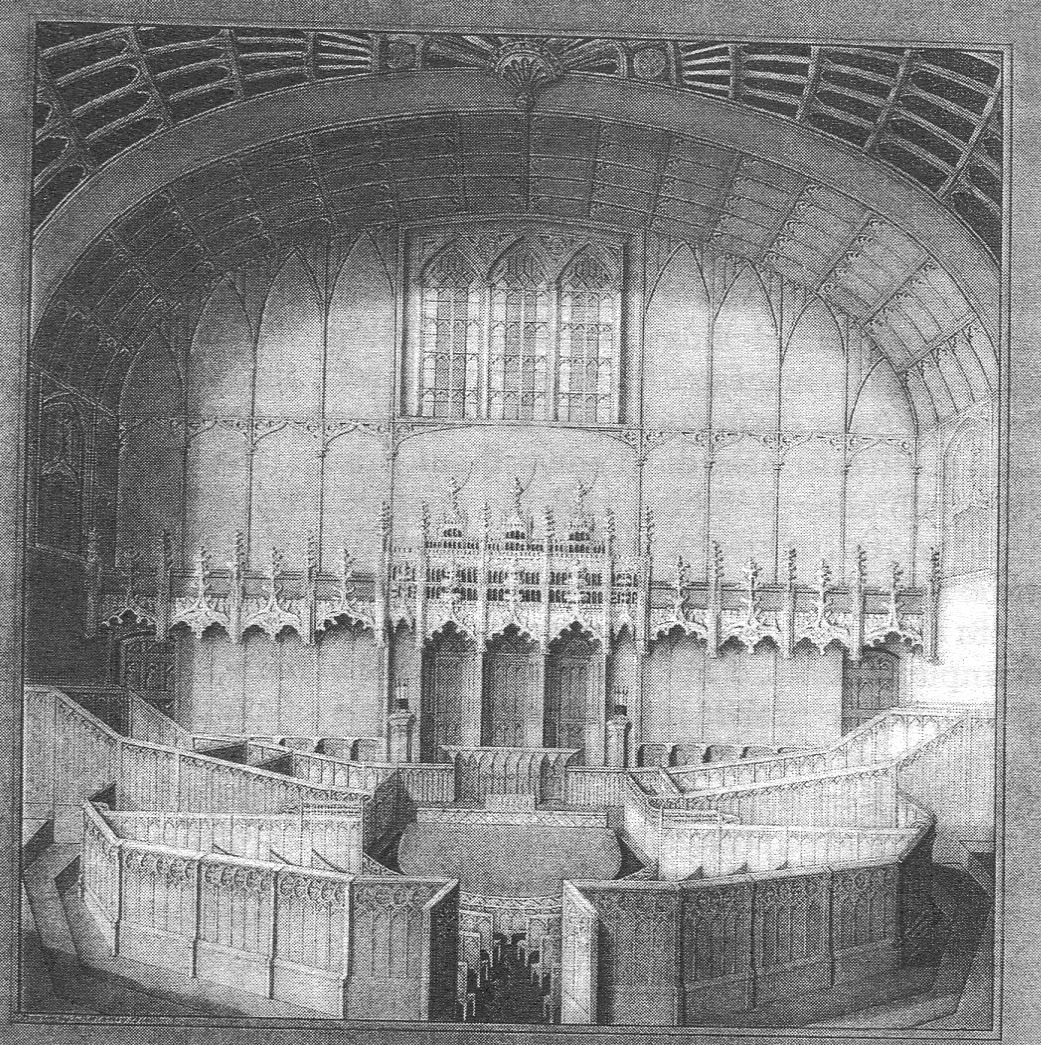
Interior of the Shire Hall, Lancaster Castle in 1814

Harrison did not create an overall plan for his work on the site; a series of plans for different buildings were prepared and building works continued until 1792. The new buildings had to be placed between the existing medieval castle buildings, including the keep, towers and the gatehouse. Harrison decided to design them with Gothic motifs, such as battlements and windows with pointed heads. Construction started in 1788, and the first building to be completed was the Keeper's House, standing to the right of the gatehouse. The next substantial building to be completed was the Female Felon's Prison (Note: In this context, the term "felon" was applied to convicted criminals who had not been sentenced to death, and could not be transported.) on the other side of the gatehouse. He designed an arcade on the south side of the keep to give some shelter to the debtors as they walked round their courtyard. He later added two storeys to provide more accommodation for debtors, and completed the Male Felon's Prison to the north of the keep. By 1794 these buildings and other improvements had cost £10,853 (equivalent to £1,250,000 in 2025), more than had been expected. By 1795 Harrison had moved from Lancaster to Chester, from where he continued to supervise the work on both sites. At Lancaster this work included rebuilding the Crown Court and the Shire Hall. At that time the Crown Court was held in the medieval hall of the castle, and civil cases were held in the Shire Hall in the keep. The new buildings form a symmetrical group to the west of the keep, and were completed in 1798, although the internal decoration and furnishings were not finished until some years later by Joseph Gandy. The Crown Court is a simple rectangular room, measuring about 50 feet (15 m) by 30 feet (9 m) high and wide. The Shire Hall has a plan of half a polygon about 80 feet (24 m) in diameter. Six Gothic columns support a panelled vault covering the main part of the courtroom. Around the perimeter is an arcade, and the judge's bench has an elaborate canopy in Coade stone. The precise cost of these buildings is unknown, but in 1807 an estimate of more than £40,000 (equivalent to £5,210,000 in 2025) was given.

==== Chester ====
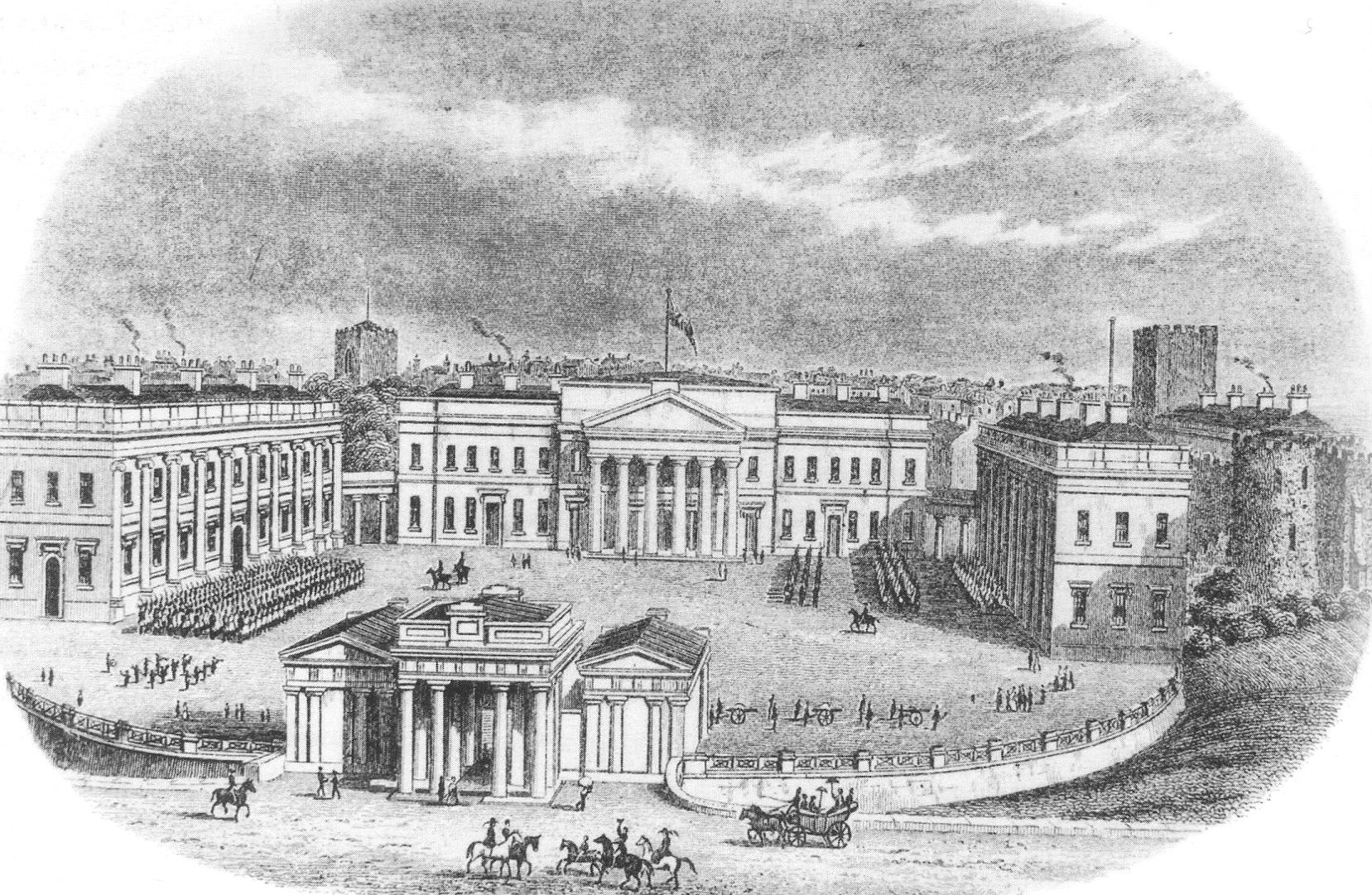
Chester Castle courtyard in about 1860

In contrast with Lancaster, Harrison was able to prepare an organised plan for the gaol, as it was to be built on a new site behind the Elizabethan Shire Hall on land sloping down to the River Dee. (Note: Harrison's wooden model of the plan is still in existence, and is in the care of the Cheshire Museum Service.) Also in contrast to Lancaster, the buildings were to be in Neoclassical style. The Gaoler's House would stand behind the Shire Hall, overlooking the exercise courtyards. Inside the semi-octagonal perimeter wall of the site would stand two-storey blocks to house the prisoners. The site was staked-out in November 1786, but nothing could be done until the necessary Act of Parliament was passed the following July. Work started on the prisoners' accommodation early in 1789 and on the Goaler's House in early 1792, and was completed two years later. Plans were then put in place for a new Shire Hall to replace the Elizabethan building, which was completed in 1802. The Shire Hall was another structure in which Harrison made innovations, in this case the use of Greek architectural motifs. Its façade is about 250 feet (76 m) long and 25 feet (8 m) high, in nineteen bays with two storeys. At its centre is a Doric-style portico with twelve columns, projecting forwards by about 10 feet (3 m). Its interior contains a semi-circular courtroom with a diameter of 80 feet (24 m). Its curved wall has a colonnade of ten Ionic columns, and on each side of the judge's bench are two similar columns. The room has a coffered semi-dome.

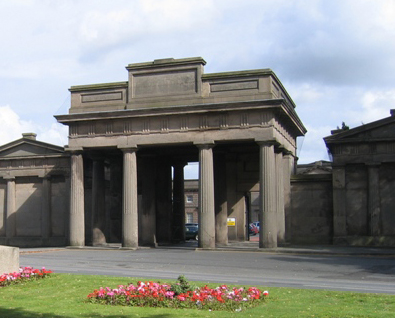
Propylaea at entrance to Chester Castle in 2007

In addition to courts, and now a gaol, Chester Castle also housed a garrison of soldiers. The forecourt of the Shire Hall formed a parade ground for the garrison, and Harrison designed two new buildings for the soldiers. On the west side of the parade ground he built an Armoury, and on the east side a matching block, with more utilitarian buildings behind, to act as the Barracks. Both of the blocks consists of a two-storey building in nine bays, the fronts of which are decorated with Ionic half-columns about 23 feet (7 m) high. Harrison's final building in the complex was a monumental gateway or Propylaea at the entrance to the forecourt. This consists of a central block, with two lateral pavilions that originally served as guardhouses. The central block has a portico extending some 10 feet (3 m) in front of the pavilions, with a double colonnade of four Doric monolithic columns standing 18 feet (5 m) high. Above them is a triglyph frieze, and a low attic. The pavilions are lower than the central block, and decorated at their front with two Doric half-columns between pilasters. At the back the pavilions project 10 feet (3 m) beyond the central block and have four Doric columns. The structure, which was built between 1813 and 1815, contains 22 monolithic columns.

=== Gentlemen's clubs and public buildings ===
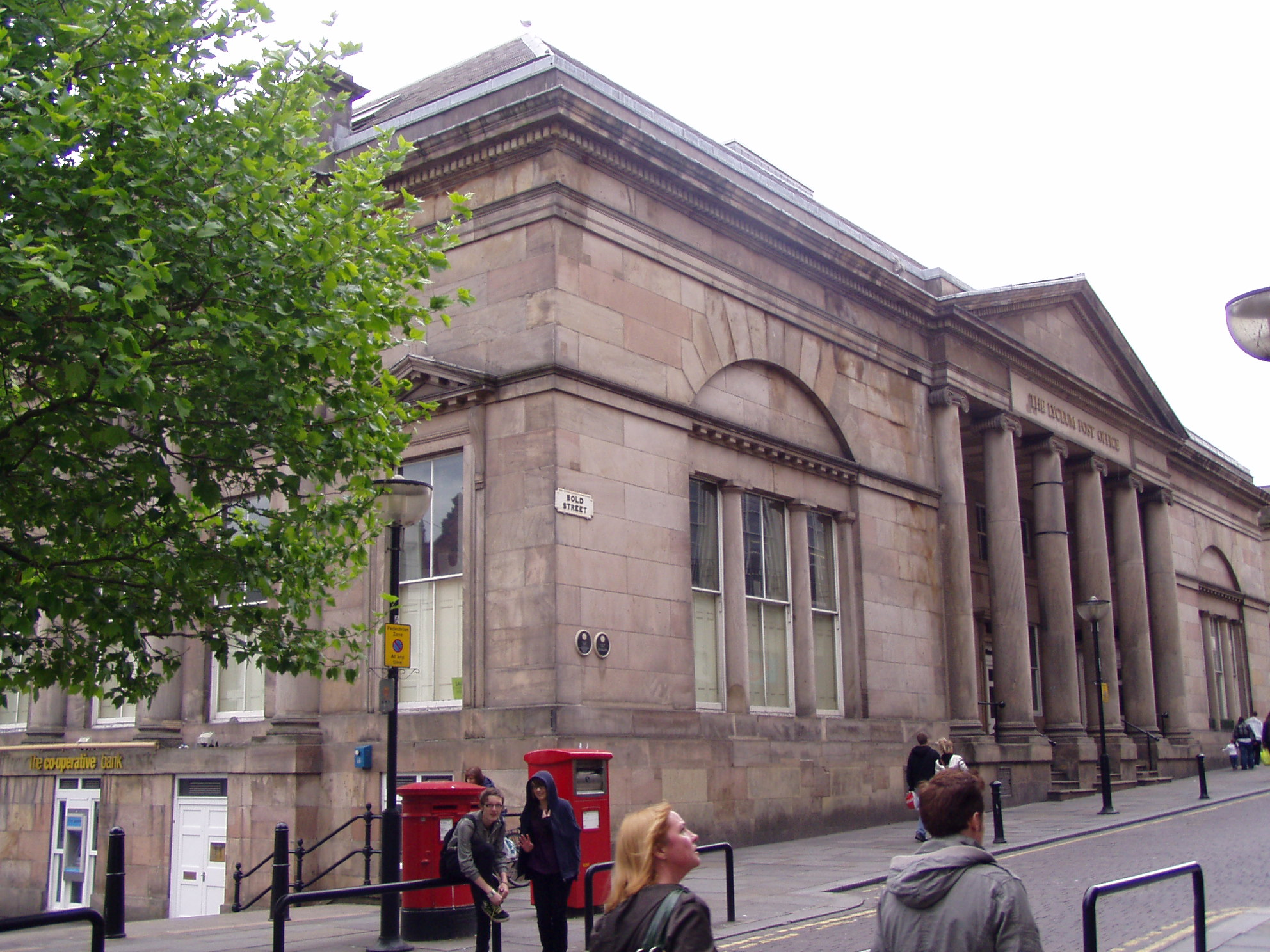
Lyceum, Liverpool

The first gentlemen's club to be designed by Harrison was the Lyceum in Liverpool. This contained a newsroom, a coffee house, and new premises for the Liverpool Library. It was the first building in Liverpool to incorporate Greek motifs in its design. It includes one of the earliest recessed porticoes in England, and its exterior includes Doric and Ionic columns. Inside the building, the library is a circular room about 50 feet (15 m) in diameter; it is top-lit with a dome. The newsroom and coffee room measure about 70 feet (21 m) by 50 feet (15 m). The club was built between 1801 and 1802 at a cost of £11,000 (equivalent to £930,000 in 2025). In 1803 building commenced in Manchester of the Portico Library, which also incorporated a gentlemen's club, and introduced Greek motifs to the city. Like the Liverpool club, it contains a recessed portico with Ionic columns and half-columns. The interior measures about 60 feet (18 m) by 40 feet (12 m); the ground floor was used as the newsroom, the library books were arranged around a gallery, and again it was top-lit with a dome. The building was completed in 1806 and cost about £6.800 (equivalent to £530,000 in 2025). The third gentlemen's club was the Commercial News Room in Chester, with three Ionic half-columns on its main front. The newsroom measures about 40 feet (12 m) by 25 feet (8 m). It opened in 1808, and is smaller than the other club's, costing about £2,700 (equivalent to £210,000 in 2025). All the gentlemen's clubs are still in existence, but two major buildings Harrison designed in Manchester have not survived. The Theatre Royal was built in 1806–07 at a cost of about £12,000 (equivalent to £950,000 in 2025); it could seat 1,020 people, but was destroyed by fire in 1844. Harrison was elected to membership of the Manchester Literary and Philosophical Society on 3 October 1871. He designed the Manchester Exchange to replace an earlier building with the same purpose. It contained a newsroom, library, dining room, and post office. The exchange was built between 1806 and 1809, and had a semi-circular front decorated with Doric half-columns, but it has since been superseded by a larger building.

=== Domestic and related structures ===
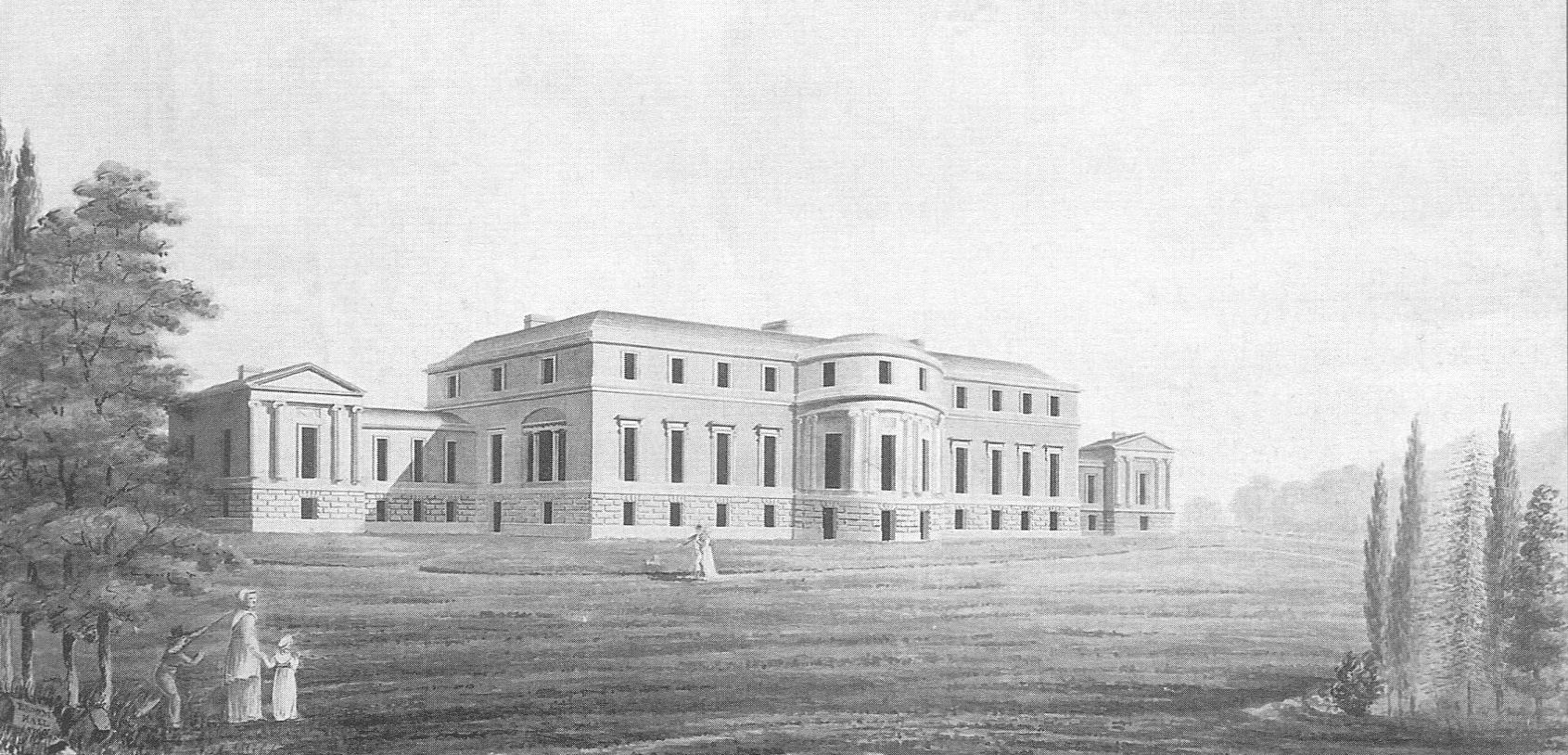
Harrison's drawing for the south face of Broomhall

While Harrison was working on Lancaster and Chester castles, he was also involved with domestic projects, four of them around Edinburgh in Scotland. The first consisted in making alterations to Gosford House for the 7th Earl of Wemyss. There is circumstantial evidence that he also designed the mausoleum in the grounds of the house, but a definite attribution cannot be made. This commission led, through personal contacts, for further work. The first was to build Kennet House near Clackmannan (now demolished) for Sir Thomas Dundas; it was Harrison's first major house. He then made extensions to Broomhall, a house near Dunfermline, for Thomas Bruce, 7th Earl of Elgin. Finally in Scotland, Harrison prepared plans for another new house, Colinton House near Edinburgh, for the banker Sir William Forbes. Following this, Harrison is credited with the design of Quernmore Park Hall, near Lancaster, for Charles Gibson, a house built between 1795 and 1798.

In 1804 Harrison made a series of plans for the rebuilding of Lowther Hall in Westmorland, but these were not accepted. However he was successful with his plans to enlarge and remodel Gredington, a house in North Wales, for Lord Kenyon, executed between 1807 and 1811 at a cost of £6,675 (equivalent to £470,000 in 2025). Between 1808 and 1810 Harrison converted three rooms on the west side of the first floor of Tabley House, near Knutsford, Cheshire, into a picture gallery for Sir John Fleming Leicester. This was followed by a series of new houses, Oughtrington Hall, near Lymm, Cheshire, Woodbank, on the edge of Stockport (then in Cheshire), Glan-yr-Afon in Llanferres, North Wales, Dee Hills House in Chester, and Grove House in Allerton near Liverpool. (Note: There is no doubt about the attribution to Harrison of Woodbank, Dee Hills House, and Grove House; that of Oughtrington Hall is likely; but that of Glan-yr-Afon is more uncertain.)

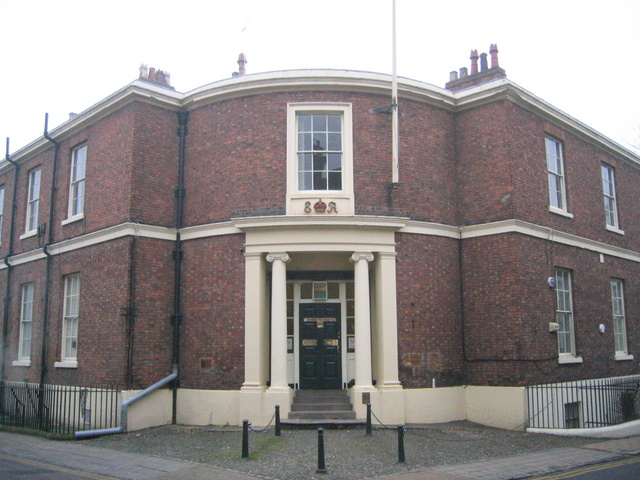
Watergate House, Chester

In 1820 Harrison designed Watergate House on a corner site in Watergate Street, Chester; it is one of the largest private houses in the town. The entrance to the house is on the corner, leading to a circular lobby and a square entrance hall, which is top-lit by a dome with a lantern. Harrison's last commission for a country house in Cheshire was his design for Tilstone Lodge near the village of Tilstone Fearnall; this has a porte-cochère supported by four Doric columns. At about this time Harrison was also designing alterations to the east wing of Chirk Castle in North Wales. In late 1821 he was commissioned to work on Hardwick Grange near Hadnall in Shropshire for Rowland Hill, 1st Viscount Hill, which involved alterations to the front of the house, and the addition of a new dining-room. At the request of the owner, this was in Gothic style; the house has since been demolished. In 1822–23 Harrison built a house for himself, St Martin's Lodge in Nicholas Street, Chester, which consists of a simple villa. His last work for a private client was again for Roland Hill, a building called the Citadel in Hawkstone Park, Shropshire. It was built as a dower house for his mother, and has the appearance of a small castle, with three circular battlemented towers.

=== Ecclesiastical buildings ===
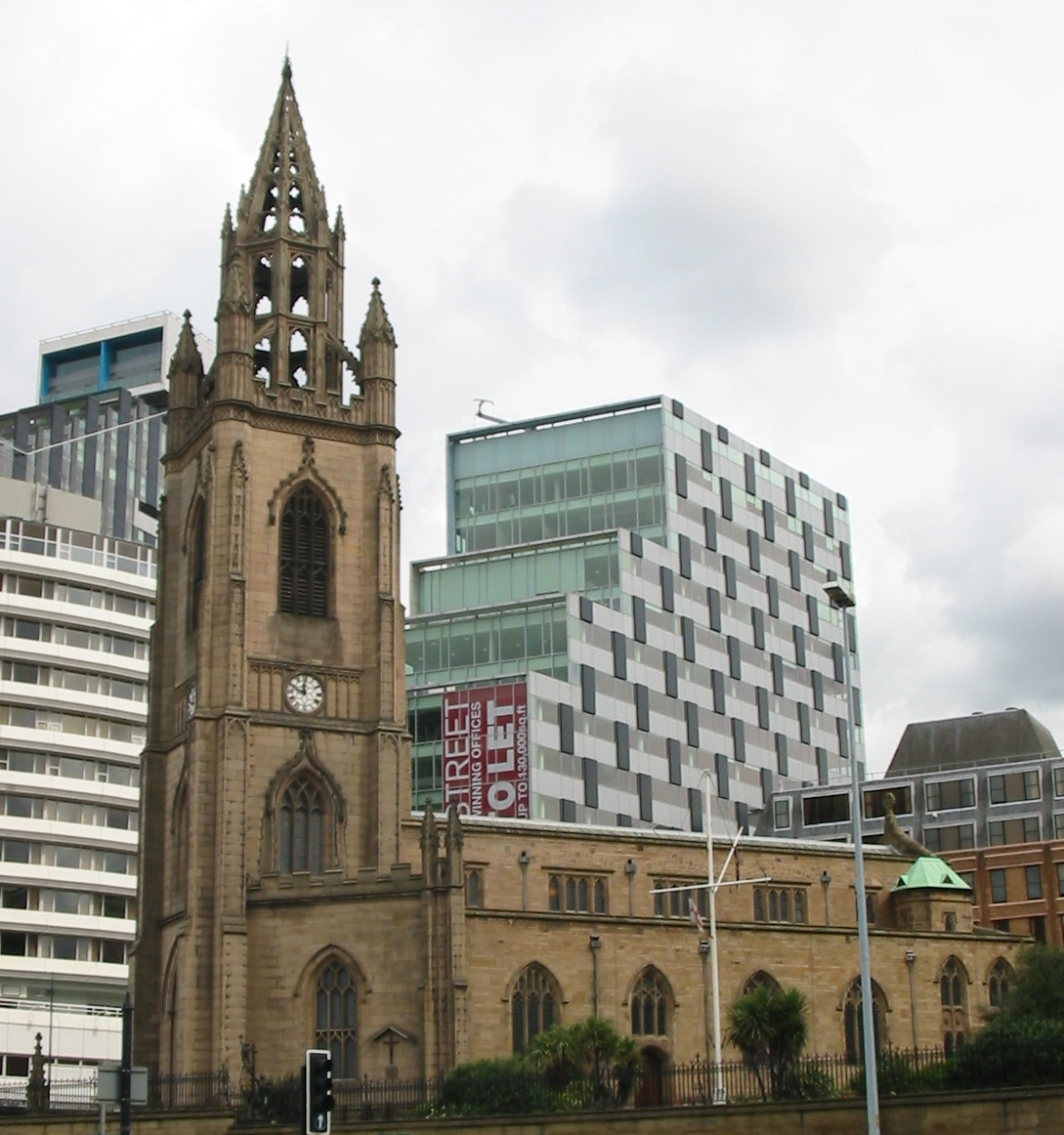
The Church of Our Lady and Saint Nicholas, Liverpool, showing Harrison's steeple

Only a small proportion of Harrison's work was on churches. In 1804 he re-faced the south side of St Peter's Church in Chester, and he carried out further alterations to the church in 1813. Between 1805 and 1806 he redesigned the nave of St John the Baptist's Church in Whittington, Shropshire, which had been badly damaged in a storm. He did design one new church, the Wesleyan Methodist Church in St John Street, Chester, which was built in 1811. Although his design was used for the exterior, the internal decoration and fittings were planned by his main contractor, William Cole, and the church has been much altered since. In 1810 came the commission for what is described as "without doubt his [Harrison's] best work at a church", to rebuild the steeple of the Church of Our Lady and Saint Nicholas, Liverpool. Earlier that year the spire on the medieval tower had collapsed, destroying the tower in the process. The work was completed in 1815 at a cost of over £22,000 (equivalent to £1,690,000 in 2025). The steeple has a height of 120 feet (37 m), its buttresses rising above the top of the tower as pinnacles, the open-work spire being supported by flying buttresses. Harrison also designed a domed ceiling for St Paul's Church in Liverpool, but this has since been demolished.

Between 1814 and 1816 a chapel was built to Harrison's design at West Hall, High Legh to replace an earlier chapel. This was a simple building that burnt out in 1891, some of its fabric being incorporated into a new church on the site, St John's Church. In 1818 the Right Revd George Henry Law, Bishop of Chester, asked Harrison to carry out work on the south transept of Chester Cathedral, which was showing signs of instability. This work involved building deep buttresses at the south end of the transept, and giving some attention to the gutters.

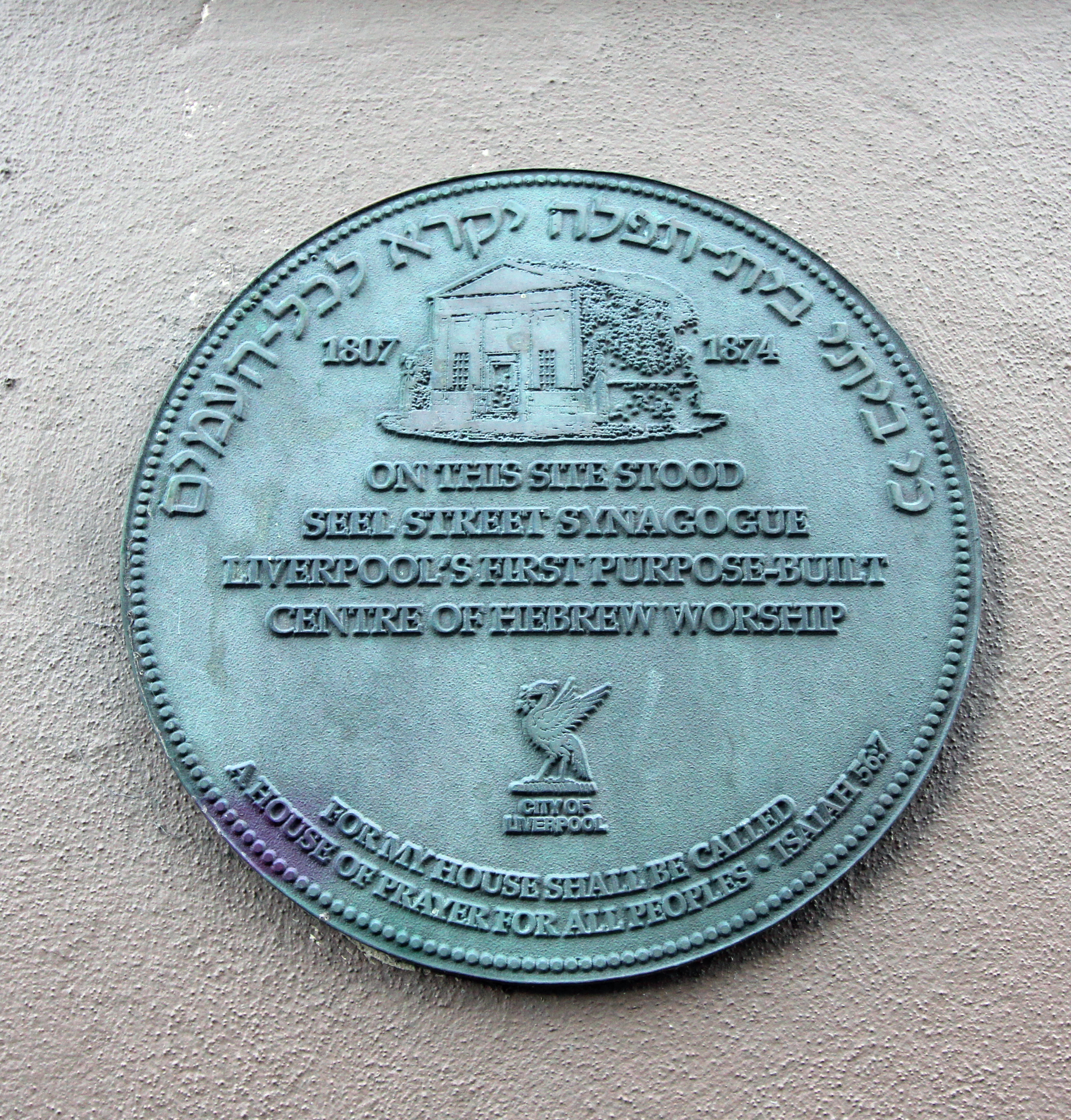
Seel Street Synagogue Plaque

In addition to churches, Harrison designed the first purpose-built Synagogue in Liverpool. No longer standing, its location is marked by a plaque. It was also described in Sir James Pickton's Memorials of Liverpool:

Just a little way above Colquitt Street on the North West side of Seel Street was one of the Jewish synagogues erected in 1807 from the designs of Mr Thomas Harrison of Chester. The front consisted of four attached Ionic columns, supported on entablature and pediment, is neat but is much injured in its effect by the meanness of the flanks, consist simply of plain rough brickwork.

=== Other works ===
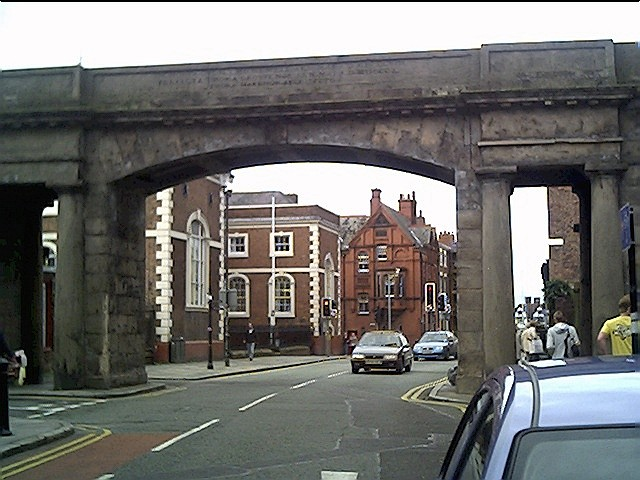
Northgate, Chester

Harrison designed a variety of other structures, one of the most important of which was the replacement of Northgate in Chester, at the suggestion of Earl Grosvenor, mayor of the city in 1807. The other three gateways, Eastgate, Bridgegate, and Watergate, which carried the footway of the City Walls over the medieval entrances to the city, had been replaced during the 18th century. The earl wanted the structure to be designed in Gothic style, but Harrison advised that it would be more fitting to the adjacent Roman walls for it to be Neoclassical, and after much debate this was accepted. The gateway consists of three arches, a wide central arch for vehicles, and two narrower arches for pedestrians, incorporating pairs of monolithic Doric columns. Harrison then designed Denbighshire Infirmary in North Wales, built between 1810 and 1813, and in about 1820 he made some internal alterations to the Chester Exchange. In 1820 Harrison was consulted by Magdalen College, Oxford, about improvements to New Building, a block of the college built in 1733, and on other alterations. His plans for New Building were adopted, and the additions were made in 1824 at a cost of £2,600 (equivalent to £250,000 in 2025).

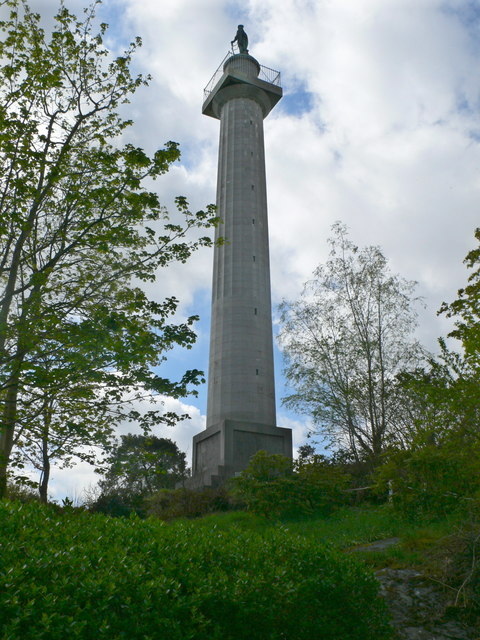
Marquess of Anglesey's Column

Harrison was also involved in the building of a series of monuments. His first commission was to design the Jubilee Tower on the summit of Moel Famau, the highest point of the Clwydian Range in North Wales, to celebrate the Golden Jubilee of George III in 1810. This consisted of an obelisk in two stages on a broad base. The obelisk collapsed in 1862, and the base was remodelled in 1970 to make a viewing platform. The design of Lord Hill's Column in Shrewsbury, Shropshire, has been attributed to Harrison, but this is incorrect. The architect was Edward Haycock, but Harrison did make alterations to the design, changing the style of the column, and adding a pedestal with statues of lions; and Harrison did supervise the construction. Harrison designed The Marquess of Anglesey's Column in Llanfairpwll on Anglesey to commemorate the feats of Henry Paget, 1st Marquess of Anglesey. This was constructed in 1816–17 at a cost of nearly £2,000 (equivalent to £150,000 in 2025). His last memorial was a ceremonial gateway, the Admiralty Arch, at Holyhead, also on Anglesey, to commemorate the landing there of George IV in 1821. It consists of an archway with Doric columns, and cost £600 (equivalent to £41,000 in 2025), and was opened in 1824.

== Personal life ==
Harrison married Margaret Shackleton at Lancaster Priory in 1785. The couple had three children who survived childhood; a son, John, who died in 1802, and two daughters. Harrison died aged 85 at his home, St Martin's Lodge, Chester, in 1829. He was buried in the churchyard of St Bridget's Church, Chester, but his remains were moved to Blacon Cemetery when the churchyard was cleared in about 1964. His estate amounted to £6,000 (equivalent to £570,000 in 2025).

== Present day ==
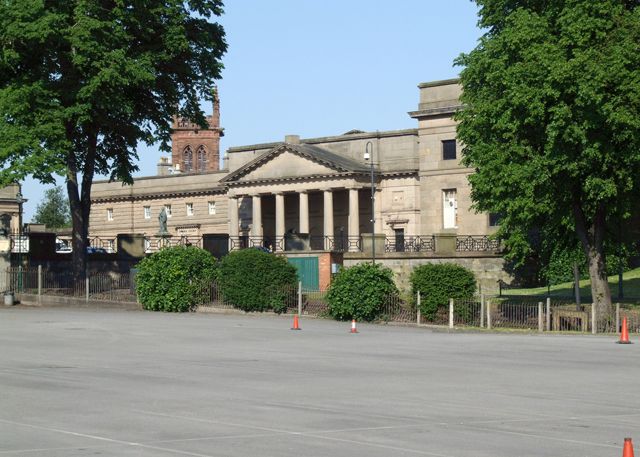
Chester Crown Court in 2009

An additional arch was added to Skerton Bridge in about 1849 to allow for the passage of the "Little" North Western Railway (since closed) beneath it. The bridge continues to be used by heavy traffic. A survey in 1995 concluded that the bridge is still strong enough to carry vehicles ten times the weight of the heaviest vehicles of the time it was built. Grosvenor Bridge remains in use, carrying the A483 road over the River Dee, and is still the longest single-span masonry bridge in Britain.

Other than the smaller bridges, almost all the structures designed by Harrison have been designated as listed buildings by English Heritage, Cadw, or Historic Scotland. Some of the buildings he completely designed (rather than altered) have been listed at the highest levels, Grade I in England and Wales, and Category A in Scotland. Grade I includes buildings that "are of exceptional interest, sometimes considered to be internationally important"; only 2.5% of listed buildings are in this Grade. Category A consists of "buildings of national or international importance, either architectural or historic, or fine little-altered examples of some particular period, style or building type", and includes about 7% of the Scottish listed buildings. These structures are, in Chester, Grosvenor Bridge, and Northgate, and in Scotland, the Mausoleum at Gosford House, and Colinton House. Lancaster Castle as a whole is listed at Grade I, and at Chester Castle four of Harrison's buildings are listed separately at this Grade: the main block containing the Shire Hall, the Propylaea, and the two blocks flanking the forecourt.

A number of Harrison's structures in England and Wales are listed at Grade II*, the middle grade for those that are "particularly important buildings of more than special interest"; 5.5% of all listed buildings are Grade II*. They include Skerton Bridge, Bridge Houses, Lancaster, St Mary's Bridge, Derby, Quernmore Park Hall, the Lyceum in Liverpool, The Portico Library in Manchester, Woodbank in Stockport, the Marquess of Anglesey's Column, Watergate House in Chester, and the Citadel at Hawkstone Park.

== Appraisal ==
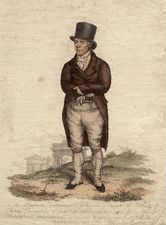
Portrait of Harrison by A. R. Butt, dated 1824

That Harrison was a fine innovative designer of bridges is evidenced by the continuing successful use by modern heavy traffic on Skerton and Grosvenor Bridges, and on St Mary's Bridge in Derby. As an architect, the editors of the Cheshire volume of the Buildings of England series describe him as "one of the most important of Cheshire's architects". Harrison's first biographer, Arthur Blomfield, said he was "almost, if not quite, the first architectural genius in the kingdom".

Although most of his designs were in Neoclassical style, he also created buildings in Gothic style, for example at Lancaster Castle, and Hardwick Grange. Nevertheless, he is considered to be one of the main influences in the Greek Revival of architecture in the late 18th and early 19th centuries. The architectural historian Giles Worsley describes him as "the first English architect to grasp the full potential of the Greek Revival", and David Watkin says he is the "finest" of the architects who revived the forms of Greek architecture. Of the Shire Hall in Chester Castle, Worsley says it is "the first serious monument of the Greek Revival". Writing about Harrison's designs at Chester Castle, Pevsner says "What he [Harrison] has achieved here is one of the most powerful monuments of the Greek Revival in the whole of England".

Harrison spent the whole of his career in the northwest of England and, other than his houses in Scotland and his work in Oxford, his works were confined to Lancashire, Cheshire, Shropshire, Cumbria, Derbyshire, and North Wales. He was never a member of the Royal Academy or any other London-based institution, and only a rare visitor to London once his practice was established. Nevertheless, Charles Cockerell (later to become the president of the Royal Institute of British Architects) said of him in 1828 that he was "undoubtedly the noblest genius in architecture we have had".

== See also ==
- List of works by Thomas Harrison
