= Chester Castle (parish) =

- Civil parish
- Interactive map of Chester Castle
- Coordinates: 53°11′N 2°53′W
- Country: England
- Primary council: Cheshire West and Chester
- County: Cheshire
- Region: North West
- Status: Civil parish
- Main settlements: none

Government
  - UK Parliament: Chester North & Neston

Population
  - Total: 0

Chester Castle is an area around the castle in Chester. It was historically an extra-parochial area and today remains a civil parish, albeit with no inhabitants.

The parish is bounded by Castle Drive to the south, Grosvenor Street (the A483) to the west, and Castle Street and St Mary's Hill to the east. Apart from the castle/prison, the parish also includes the courthouse for the Crown Court, County Hall, and the Cheshire Military Museum. In April–May 1966, the infamous Moors murders case was tried at Chester Assizes held in the courthouse which is now the Chester venue for the Crown Court.

It was part of the Chester Rural District, despite being in the middle of the city, and did not form part of Chester County Borough. This meant that County Hall was in the administrative county of Cheshire which it administered. The Local Government Act 1972 saw it become part of Chester District, along with the rest of Chester Rural District. Since April 2009 County Hall has been the headquarters of the Cheshire West and Chester Council.

In 1891 it had a population of 249, which had declined to 8 by 1971. According to the 2011 Census it had no inhabitants at all.

Chester Castle is the smallest civil parish by area in the United Kingdom.

== See also ==
- Listed buildings in Chester Castle parish
