= Statue of Michael Arthur Bass =

Statue in Burton upon Trent, England

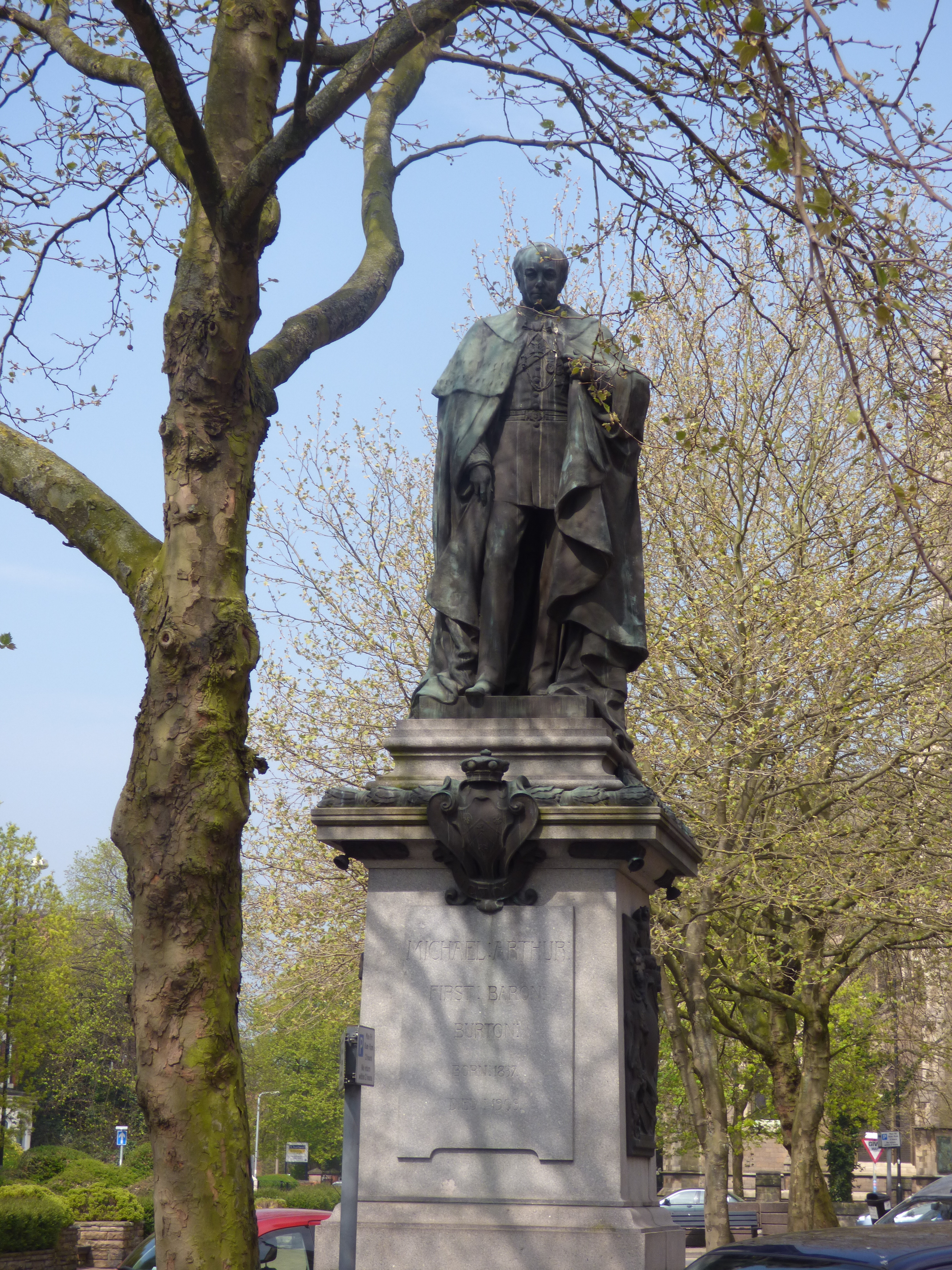
- Front of the statue
- Artist: F. W. Pomeroy
- Medium: Bronze sculpture
- Subject: Michael Bass, 1st Baron Burton
- Location: Burton upon Trent, England; 52°48′28″N 1°38′43″W

The statue of Michael Arthur Bass is a bronze sculpture of the industrialist and benefactor Michael Bass, 1st Baron Burton in Burton upon Trent, England. It was sculpted by F. W. Pomeroy and unveiled by William Legge, 6th Earl of Dartmouth on 13 May 1911, two years after Bass's death. Bass is depicted in his uniform as an officer of the local battalion of the Rifle Volunteer Corps and the coronation robes of a baron. It is sited in front of the town hall that Bass presented to the town.

== Background ==
Michael Bass, 1st Baron Burton (1837–1909) was a member of the Bass brewing family and a local benefactor. Following the 1884 death of his father (Michael Thomas Bass) he assumed leadership of the Burton upon Trent–based Bass, Ratcliff and Gretton Ltd. Bass was a local member of parliament, a supporter of Liberal Party leader William Ewart Gladstone and a friend of Edward VII from his time as Prince of Wales (Edward appointed him a knight commander of the Royal Victorian Order in 1904). Gladstone had him created a baronet in 1882 and a baron in 1886. Bass was a proud public servant, serving as justice of the peace and commanding the Burton-based 2nd Volunteer Battalion (5th Staffordshire Rifle Volunteer Corps) of the North Staffordshire Regiment until 1881 when he was appointed honorary colonel. Bass was a keen benefactor to the town of Burton, donating the town hall, Liberal Club, Conservative Club, St Paul's Institute, Ferry Bridge and Stapenhill Viaduct. He also built (in conjunction with his father) St Paul's Church and provided for its endowment, and a chapel-of-ease (St Margaret's Church on Shobnall Street). He died on 1 February 1909.

== Statue ==
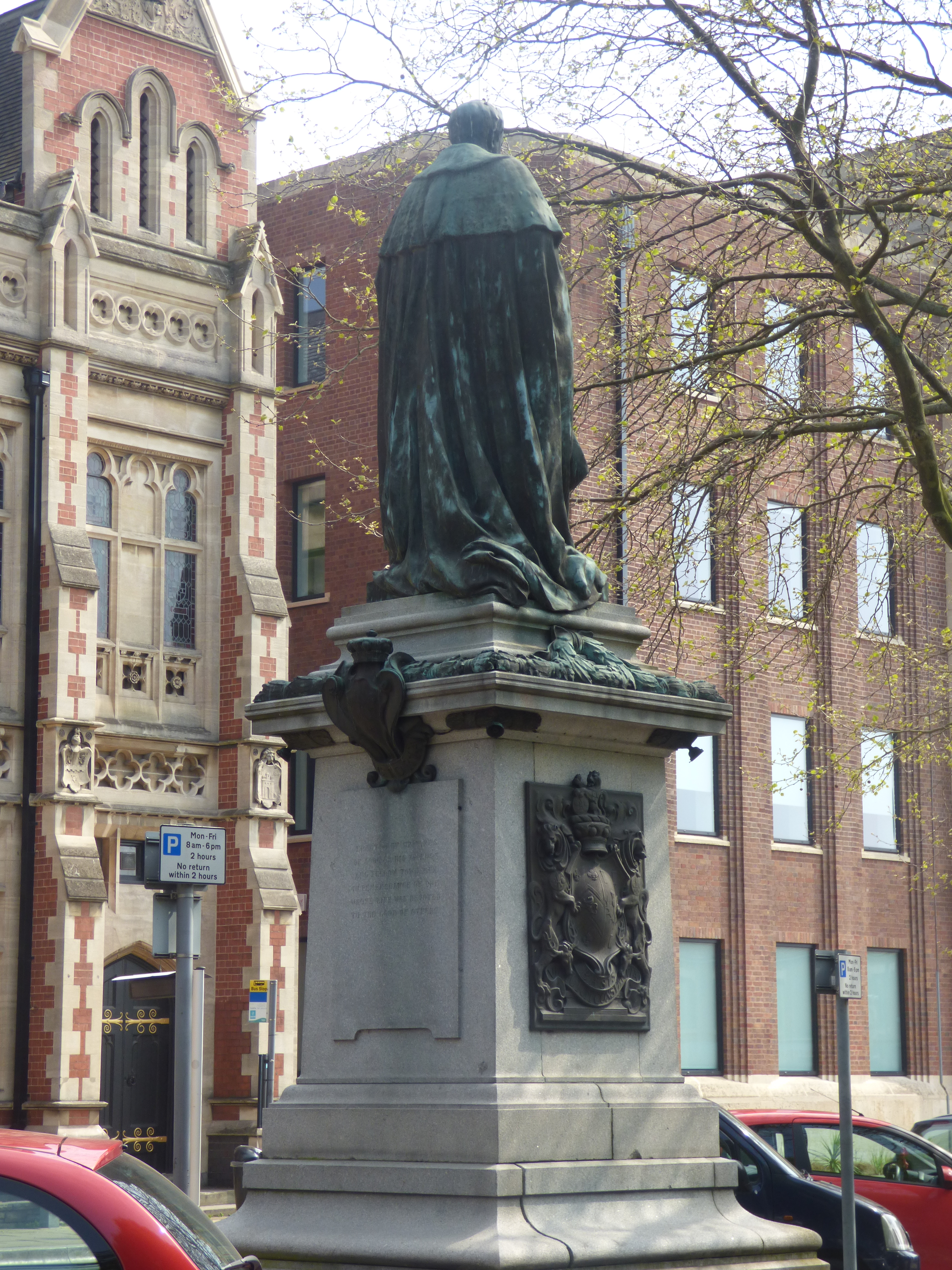
Rear of the statue

The statue was sculpted by F. W. Pomeroy. Pomeroy had never met Bass and worked from oil paintings and photographs of his subject but the result was described by the Burton Mail as a "faithful likeness". It is sculpted in the Realist style; Pomeroy had been introduced to this style, which was displacing the Victorian Romantic style, at the Lambeth School of Art where French lecturer Jules Dalou was an early proponent.

The statue of Bass is rendered in bronze and stands 3 metres (9.8 ft) tall atop a 3.7-metre (12 ft) tall grey Aberdeen granite plinth. Bass is depicted in his late middle age and the statue has been described by George T. Noszlopy and Fiona Waterhouse (2005) as "somewhat corpulent". Bass is shown wearing his Rifle Volunteer Corps uniform under the coronation robes of a baron. His right leg is forward and bent with his foot protruding beyond the front of the plinth, which Noszlopy and Waterhouse say creates a sense of movement in the piece; Bass's hands grasp the hems of his robe. In addition to the statue Pomeroy produced a bust of Bass that was exhibited at the Royal Academy in 1910.

The plinth has variants of the Bass coat of arms, measuring 1.9 by 0.94 metres (6 ft 3 in × 3 ft 1 in), on its south and north faces. The east (front) of the plinth contains the inscription "Michael Arthur/First Baron/Burton/Born 1837/Died 1909". The west (rear) face is engraved "Erected by upwards/of 6000 of his friends/and fellow townsmen/in remembrance of one/whose life was devoted/to the good of others". The location of the piece was decided upon in August 1910 following trials with a mock-up of the work, produced by Charles Sydney Spooner, placed at various locations in Burton. The approved location was in front of the town hall (which Bass had paid for) and directly to the east of St Paul's. The statue was unveiled on 13 May 1911 by the Lord Lieutenant of Staffordshire (William Legge, 6th Earl of Dartmouth). The statue received statutory protection as a Grade II listed building on 22 June 1979.
