= Arnold Loxam =

Professional concert organist

Arnold Loxam (3 May 1916 – 14 March 2010) was a professional concert organist. He was a native of Bradford, Yorkshire and gave his first broadcast there as a child pianist in 1925. Loxam made his first appearance on the keyboard of the Wurlitzer theatre organ at the then New Victoria cinema in Bradford. Arnold Loxam first visited the New Victoria Cinema, Bradford, which later became the Odeon, when he was a 14-year-old member of the audience on the opening night of the theatre on 22 September 1930.

In 1946 he began playing regularly for New Victoria audiences and broadcasting from the theatre for BBC Radio. He was appointed deputy organist playing every Sunday and deputised for Norman Briggs until 1948. From December 1948 Arnold also played full weeks or odd days as well as Sundays. He was famous for his bouncey style. He gave his first solo broadcast on the BBC Theatre Organ on 29 November 1947. The association with Bradford continued until 1962 when the BBC switched its broadcasts to the Leeds Odeon. Dr Loxam was invited back in 1968 to make a final broadcast from what had by then become the Gaumont before the Wurlitzer organ was taken to the North East Theatre Organ's headquarters in Howden-le-Wear, County Durham.

Loxam met his future wife in 1948 when she was working at the New Victoria as an usherette. Mrs Audrey Loxam was his driver for 25 years, chauffeuring him around to fulfil a busy schedule of engagements in this country and overseas. He has appeared in concert almost everywhere that it is possible to play in England, and has also played concerts in the Netherlands, Canada and the United States. North American audiences remember the Union Jack socks that he proudly wore at his concerts. In 1996 Arnold Loxam was awarded an honorary doctorate from the University of Bradford for his musical achievements. Arnold Loxam died, aged 93, on 14 March 2010.

== Discography ==
His performances include:

- Arnold Loxam at the Wurlitzer Organ, Burton upon Trent Town Hall "WURLITZER SEASONS"
- Arnold Loxam at the Compton Organs, Southampton Guildhall "AT THE CONSOLES"
- Arnold Loxam at the Wurlitzer Theatre Organ, Burton upon Trent Town Hall "COME DANCING"
- Arnold Loxam at the Wurlitzer Theatre Organ New Victoria Centre, Howden-Le-Wear "ARNOLD LOXAM CELEBRATES"
- Arnold Loxam at the Organ of Ossett Town Hall "THEATRE ORGAN TIME"

=== Selective releases ===
Album
Act	Release	Catalogue	Year	Notes
Arnold Loxam at the Wurlitzer Organ	Mighty Like a Rose	Crystal CRY 3003	1968	Produced by John Foskett
Arnold Loxam at the Lowery Organ	I'm in a Dancing Mood	Crystal CRY 3031	1973	Produced by Stanley R White
Arnold Loxam	At The Wurlitzer Organ New Victoria, Bradford, Yorkshire	Deroy DEROY 1066	1974	Produced by Derrick Marsh
Arnold Loxam	At The Wurlitzer Organ: Odeon Theatre, Headrow, Leeds	Deroy DEROY 1129	1974	Produced by Derrick Marsh
