= F. W. Pomeroy =

British sculptor (1856–1924)

Frederick William Pomeroy
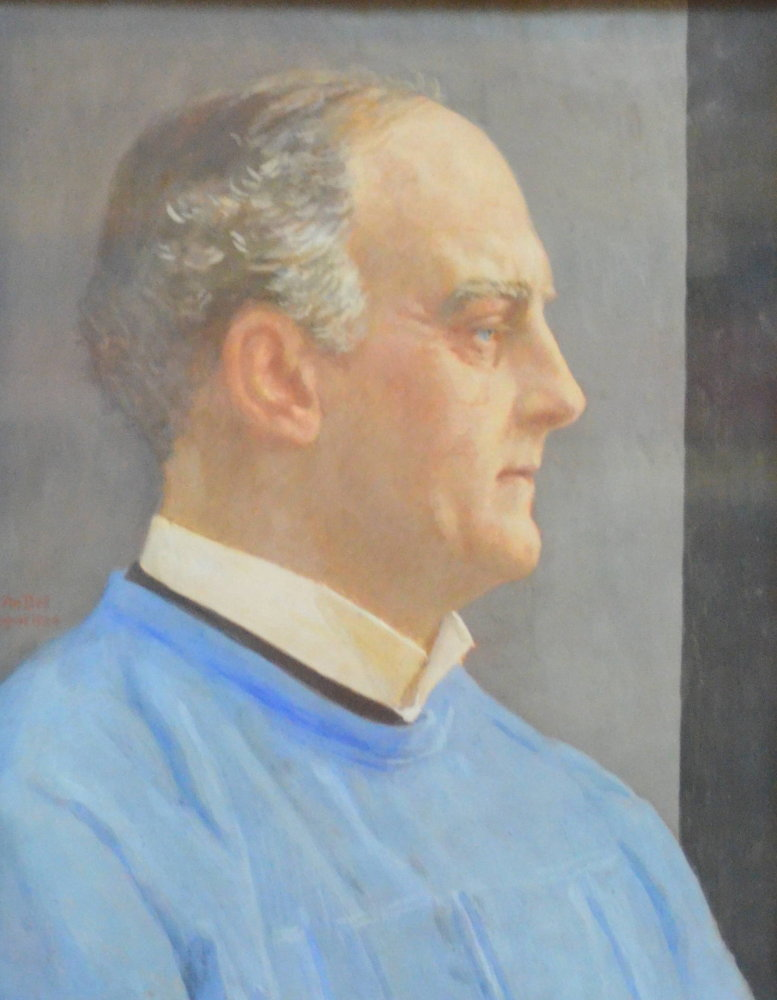
- Pomeroy, 1908, by Robert Anning Bell
- Born: 9 October 1856; Lambeth, London, England
- Died: 26 May 1924 (aged 67); Cliftonville, Kent, England
- Resting place: Boscombe, Hampshire, England
- Education: South London Technical School of Art; Royal Academy Schools
- Known for: Sculpture
- Movement: New Sculpture

Frederick William Pomeroy RA (9 October 1856 – 26 May 1924) was a prolific British sculptor of architectural and monumental works. He became a leading sculptor in the New Sculpture movement, a group distinguished by a stylistic turn towards naturalism and for their works of architectural sculpture. Pomeroy had several significant public works in London and elsewhere in the United Kingdom, notably in Belfast. His work in London includes the figure of Lady Justice (1905–1906) on the dome of the Old Bailey.

== Biography ==
Pomeroy was born in Lambeth, London, the son of a stone-carver. After his father died in 1869 Pomeroy, aged 14, was left as the main wage-earner for the family and was apprenticed to a firm of architectural stone carvers. Later he trained, for four years, with William Silver Frith at the South London Technical School of Art where he was also taught by Jules Dalou. The naturalistic style of Dalou's sculptures were a great influence on Pomeroy's subsequent works. In 1880, Pomeroy was able to enrol in the Royal Academy Schools, where he won a number of prizes, including silver medals in both 1882 and 1883. In 1885 he won a gold medal and travelling scholarship which allowed him to study in Paris under Antonin Mercié and also in Italy.

On returning to London, Pomeroy joined the Art Workers Guild in 1887, and in 1888 began exhibiting with the Arts and Crafts Exhibition Society. In 1887 he was part of a group of artists, supported by the Royal Doulton Company, who created sculptures for a fountain in honour of Queen Victoria in Glasgow. For the fountain, now situated on Glasgow Green, Pomeroy carved the group representing Australia. Also in 1887 he met the architect J. D. Sedding who subsequently commissioned a large number of decorative architectural works from Pomeroy. These included carvings for the Church of Our Most Holy Redeemer in London, an exterior sculpture for the tower of St Clement's Church in Bournemouth plus a screen and choir stalls in bronze for Holy Trinity, Sloane Street. Pomeroy also created a bronze angel, now lost, for St Peter's Church, Ealing to accompany decorative work by Henry Wilson.

Alongside his architectural work, Pomeroy continued to create smaller exhibition pieces. He carved a marble replica of Frederic Leighton's 1877 bronze sculpture Athlete wrestling with a python which was exhibited at the Royal Academy in 1891 before being transported to Denmark and, eventually, to Australia. The piece was poorly received at the academy in comparison to the bronze original but a number of other works in the New Sculpture style by Pomeroy helped build his artistic reputation. These included his 1890 statuette of Dionysus, now in the Tate, So on a Delphic Reed from 1888 and Love the Conqueror shown at both the Royal Academy and the Walker Art Gallery in Liverpool during 1893. During the 1890s, Pomeroy showed eleven works at the Royal Academy, eight of which were small statuettes. Some of these, including Perseus and Love the Conqueror were reproduced in sizes suitable for the domestic market, although some much larger versions of Perseus were also cast, including a life-size bronze now in the National Museum Cardiff.

After Sedding died in 1891, his pupil Henry Wilson took over his architectural practice and continued to commission designs from Pomeroy. These included a chimney piece, now destroyed, for a library at Ladbroke Grove in London, decorative items for the library and chapel at Welbeck Abbey in Nottinghamshire and a frieze for the chapel at Douglas Castle in South Lanarkshire. The architect Edward William Mountford commissioned architectural sculptures and decorations from Pomeroy for Paisley Town Hall in 1890 and, more extensively, for Sheffield Town Hall in 1895. For the latter Pomeroy created a number of works, including a frieze of industrial workers, low-reliefs of figures representing Steam and Electricity, figures of Thor and Vulcan supporting the city crest plus a series of six lunettes and spandrels representing aspects of civic virtue.

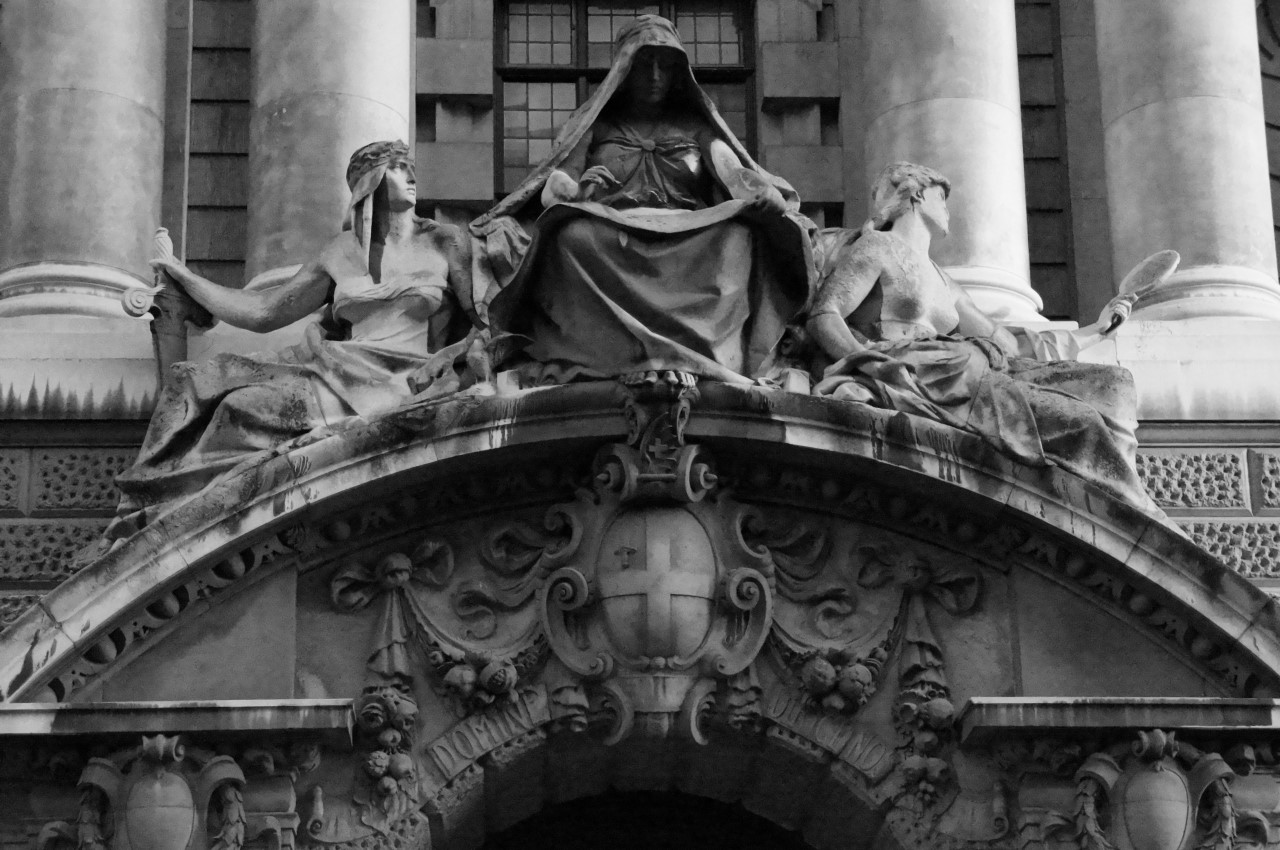
Fortitude, Truth and the Recording Angel, The Old Bailey, London

In the first decade of the 20th century, Pomeroy received several further commissions for architectural sculptures on buildings designed by Mountford. These included the figure of Lady Justice on the dome of the Old Bailey plus figures for the entrance to the court, statuettes, lamp standards and other decorations for the Liverpool Museum and Technical College, work for Lancaster Town Hall and a series of low-relief panels on gin-making for the exterior of Booth's Distillery in central London. Starting in 1905 Pomeroy created four colossal bronze figures for the upstream side of Vauxhall Bridge in London.

In 1907 Pomeroy became Master of the Art Workers Guild. He was elected an Associate member of the Royal Academy in 1906, and a full member in 1917. From 1898 to 1908 he was a regular exhibitor with the International Society of Sculptors, Painters and Gravers, at Leeds City Art Gallery from 1897 to 1909, with the Aberdeen Artists Society from 1893 to 1923 and with the Royal Scottish Academy he showed seven works between 1903 and 1924. Pomeroy displayed works at the Royal Academy Summer Exhibition each year from 1885 to 1924 and, in the same period, showed 17 works at the Royal Glasgow Institute of the Fine Arts and, late in his life, became a regular exhibitor with the Royal West of England Academy. Several museums hold examples of Pomeroy's work including the Tate, the Victoria and Albert Museum, the Ashmolean Museum in Oxford, the Laing Art Gallery in Newcastle upon Tyne and Pollok House in Glasgow.

In 1913 Pomeroy married Patricia Morrison Coughlan, of Douglas, Cork, with who he had two sons. Pomeroy died on 26 May 1924, aged 65, and was buried at Boscombe in Hampshire. A memorial to him is in St James's Church, Piccadilly.

== Public works ==
=== 1887–1905 ===
| Image | Title / subject | Location and coordinates | Date | Type | Material | Dimensions | Designation | Wikidata | Notes |
|---|---|---|---|---|---|---|---|---|---|
| More images | Australia | The Doulton Fountain, Glasgow Green | 1887 | Sculpture group | Terracotta | | Category A | Q17568982 | |
| More images | Robert Burns | Fountain Gardens, Paisley | 1895 | Statue on pedestal with plaques | Bronze and granite | | Category B | Q17843407 | |
| More images | The Nymph of Loch Awe | Tate Britain | 1897 | Sculpture | Marble | 26.7 x 64.1 x 22.9cm | | Q19357579 | |
| More images | Gordon Highlanders memorial obelisk | Duthie Park, Aberdeen | 1898 | Obelisk | Granite | 4.5m high | Category C | Q77776613 | Douglas Strachan (designer), Henderson & Webster (masons), originally topped with a bronze sculpture which is now missing |
| More images | Statue of Admiral Robert Blake | Cornhill, Bridgwater, Somerset | 1900 | Statue on pedestal | Bronze and granite | | Grade II* | Q30625603 | |
| | William Ewart Gladstone | Central Lobby, Houses of Parliament, London | 1900 | Statue on pedestal | Marble | 2.4m tall | | | |
| More images | Statue of Oliver Cromwell | Market Hill, St Ives, Cambridgeshire | 1901 | Statue on pedestal and steps | Bronze and Portland stone | | Grade II | Q22917664 | |
| | Frederick John Horniman | Exterior of the Horniman Museum, London | 1901 | Plaque | Bronze | | | | |
| More images | Dr. Walter Hook | City Square, Leeds | 1903 | Statue on pedestal | Bronze and granite | | Grade II | Q26655854 | |
| More images | Statue of Queen Victoria | Forecourt of Chester Castle, Cheshire | 1903 | Statue on pedestal | Bronze and stone | | Grade II | Q15615686 | |
| More images | Robert Ascroft M.P. | Alexandra Park, Oldham, Greater Manchester | 1903 | Statue on pedestal | Bronze and stone | | Grade II | Q26497406 | |
| More images | Robert Burns | The Domain, Sydney, Australia | 1905 | Statue on pedestal | Bronze and stone | | | Q106458976 | |
| More images | Queen Victoria | Interior of Woolwich Town Hall, London | 1905 | Statue on pedestal | Marble | | | Q125678400 | |
| | Samuel Hole | Rochester Cathedral, Kent | 1905 | Recumbent figure | Marble | | Grade I | | |
| More images | Archbishop Frederick Temple | St Paul's Cathedral, London | 1905 | Curved relief plaque | Bronze | | | | |

=== 1906–1909 ===
| Image | Title / subject | Location and coordinates | Date | Type | Material | Dimensions | Designation | Wikidata | Notes |
|---|---|---|---|---|---|---|---|---|---|
| More images | Justice | The Old Bailey, London | 1906 | Statue | Gilded bronze | | Grade II* | Q55247277 | |
| More images | Hibernia and Minerva with Industry, Labour & Liberty | Pediment, Belfast City Hall | 1906 | Deep relief architectural sculpture | Stone | | Grade A | | |
| More images | James Nugent | St John's Gardens, Liverpool | 1906 | Statue on pedestal | Bronze and stone | | Grade II | Q26504982 | |
| More images | Marquess of Dufferin | Belfast City Hall | 1906 | 3 piece sculpture group on pedestal with canopy | Bronze and stone | | Grade A | Q17778397 | |
| | Boer War memorial | The Great Hall, Guildhall, London | 1907 | 3 Relief panels | Bronze | | | | |
| More images | Agriculture, Architecture, Pottery and Engineering | West side of Vauxhall Bridge, London | 1907 | Four statues | Bronze | | Grade II* | Q1142134 | |
| | George Ridding | Southwell Minster, Nottinghamshire | 1907 | Statue on platform | Bronze and marble | | Grade I | | Memorial designed by W D Caroe |
| More images | William Henry Perkin | Royal Society of Chemistry, Burlington House, London | 1907 | Bust on pedestal | Marble | | | | |
| More images | Francis Bacon | South Square, Gray's Inn, London | 1908 | Statue on pedestal | Bronze and Portland stone | | Grade II | Q27084378 | |
| More images | Bishop Arthur Lloyd | Newcastle Cathedral | 1908 | Effigy | Alabaster | | | | |
| More images | Sir James Horner Haslett | Belfast City Hall | 1909 | Statue on pedestal | Marble and granite | | Grade B1 | Q17778550 | |
| More images | Learning | World Museum, Byrom Street, Liverpool | 1909 | Statue on column | Bronze | | Grade II* | Q5146857 | Former College of Technology and Museum extension, with other decoration by Pomeroy, architect E.W. Mountford. |
| More images | Navigation | World Museum Liverpool | 1909 | Statue on column | Bronze | | Grade II* | Q5146857 | |

=== 1910–1919 ===
| Image | Title / subject | Location and coordinates | Date | Type | Material | Dimensions | Designation | Wikidata | Notes |
|---|---|---|---|---|---|---|---|---|---|
| More images | Thomas Guthrie | West Princes Street Gardens, Edinburgh | 1910 | Statue on pedestal | Portland stone | | Category B | Q17813224 | |
| More images | Statue of Michael Bass, 1st Baron Burton | In front of Burton upon Trent Town Hall | 1911 | Statue on pedestal | Bronze and stone | | Grade II | Q26290476 | |
| More images | Frederick Stanley, 16th Earl of Derby | Interior of St George's Hall, Liverpool | 1911 | Statue | Marble | | | Q114932527 | |
| | George Livesey | Grounds of former Livesey Museum for Children, London | Unveiled 1911 | Statue on pedestal | Bronze and stone | | Grade II | Q26665510 | |
| | Hywel Dda | The Marble Hall, Cardiff City Hall | 1916 | Statue group on pedestal | Marble | | | | |
| More images | Birthplace of Thomas Gray | 39 Cornhill, London | 1917-18 | Plaque | Bronze | | Grade II | | |
| More images | R. J. McMordie | Belfast City Hall | 1919 | Statue on pedestal | Carrara marble and granite | | Grade B1 | Q17778465 | |

=== 1920–1924 ===
| Image | Title / subject | Location and coordinates | Date | Type | Material | Dimensions | Designation | Wikidata | Notes |
|---|---|---|---|---|---|---|---|---|---|
| More images | George Curzon, 1st Marquess Curzon of Kedleston | Victoria Memorial, Kolkata | 1921 | Statue on pedestal | Marble | | | Q126372276 | |
| More images | War memorial | Ramsey, Cambridgeshire | 1921 | Statue on column | Bronze and stone | | Grade II | Q26459919 | |
| | Sir Clements Markham | Courtyard of Lowther Lodge, London | 1921 | Bust | Bronze | | Grade II* | | |
| More images | Robert Burns | Domain Drive, Auckland, New Zealand | 1921 | Statue on pedestal | Bronze and granite | 2.745m | Historic Place Category 2 | Q79303840 | |
| More images | War memorial | Coleraine, County Londonderry | 1922 | Statue on obelisk with base figure | Bronze and Portland stone | 5.4m high | | | |
| More images | War memorial | Kensington High Street, London | 1922 | Cross on column and pedestal | Portland stone | 10.6m high | Grade II | Q26300012 | Architect: Hubert Christian Corlette. |
| | War memorial | Inver Park, Larne, County Antrim | 1922 | Cenotaph with sculpture figures | Portland stone and bronze | | Grade B1 | | |
| More images | Brigadier-General John Nicholson | Market Square, Lisburn | 1922 | Statue on pedestal | Bronze and stone | | Grade B | | |

=== Other works ===
- Marble reredos at St Saviour's Church, Colgate, West Sussex
- A bust of the surgeon Sir Henry Thompson at Golders Green in London.
- Chancel stalls and screen at Holy Trinity, Sloane Street, London.
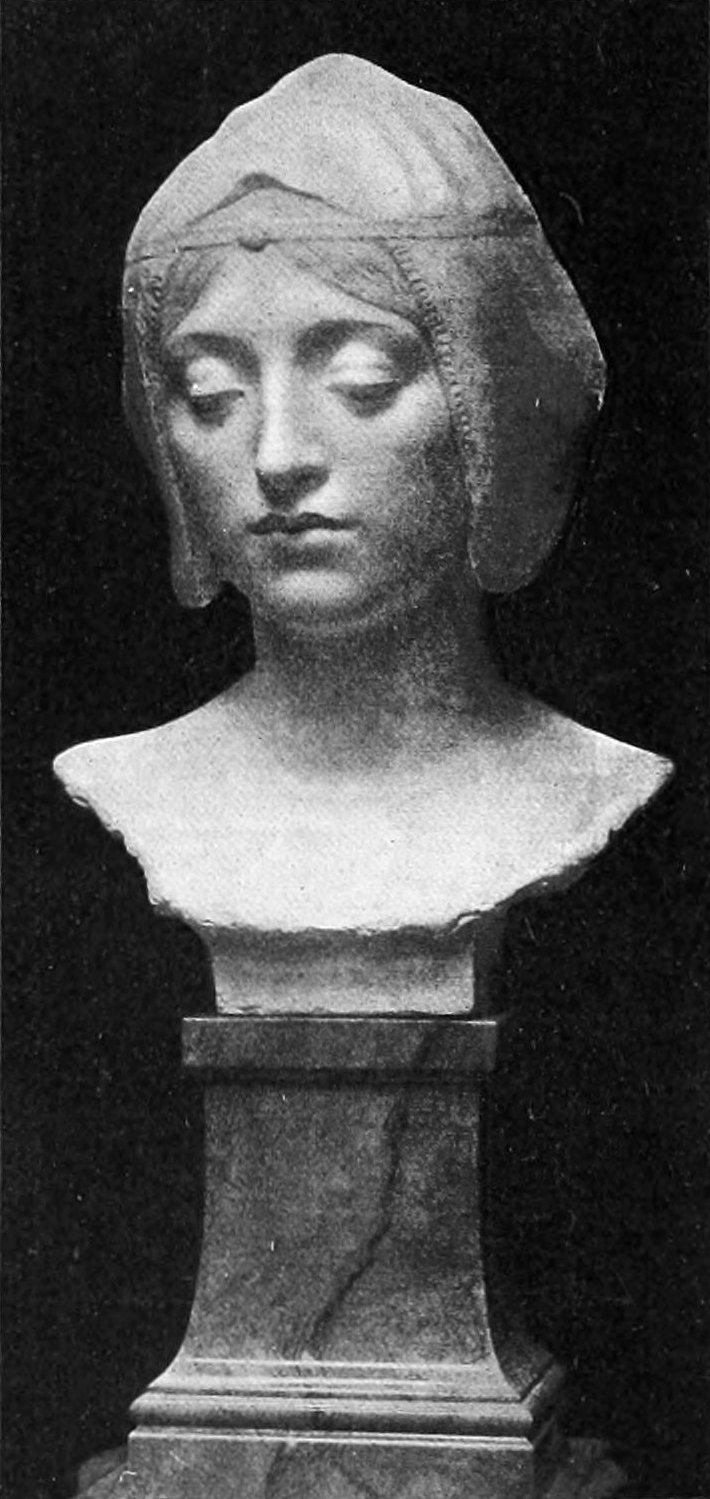
The Lily of Killarney

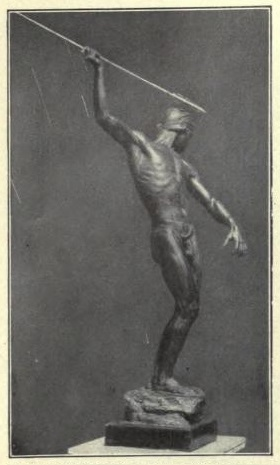
The Spearman bronze statue

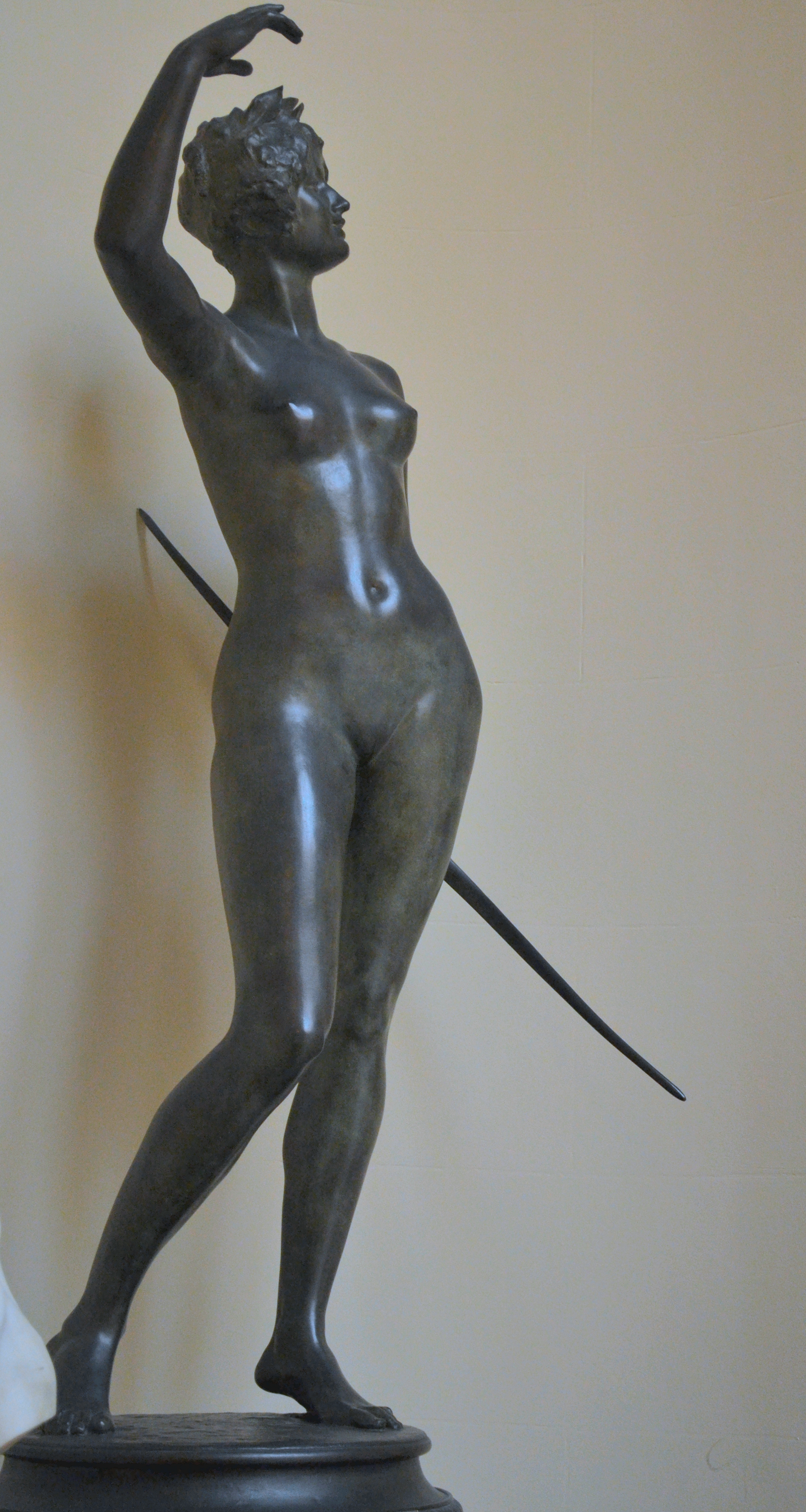
The Wood Nymph (1908), Lady Lever Art Gallery, Port Sunlight, Cheshire
