= Chester Castle =

Castle in Chester, England

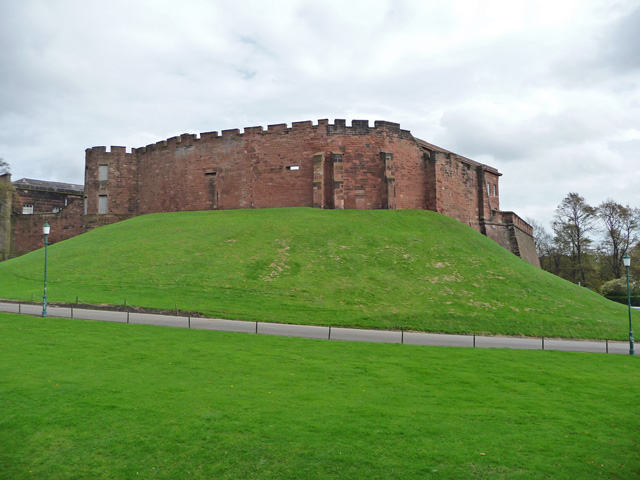
- Chester Castle

- Location within Cheshire

General information
- Architectural style: Norman, Neoclassical
- Location: Chester, Cheshire, England
- Coordinates: 53.1853°N 2.8923°W
- Construction started: 1070
- Completed: 1822

Design and construction
- Architect: Thomas Harrison

Chester Castle is in the city of Chester, Cheshire, England. It is sited at the southwest extremity of the area bounded by the city walls. The castle stands on an eminence overlooking the River Dee. In the castle complex are the remaining parts of the medieval castle together with the neoclassical buildings designed by Thomas Harrison which were built between 1788 and 1813. Parts of the neoclassical buildings are used today by the Crown Court and as a military museum. The museum and the medieval remains are a tourist attraction.

== History ==
The castle was built in 1070 by Hugh d'Avranches, the second Earl of Chester. It is possible that it was built on the site of an earlier Saxon fortification but this has not been confirmed. The original structure would have been a motte-and-bailey castle with a wooden tower. In the 12th century the wooden tower was replaced by a square stone tower, the Flag Tower. During the same century the stone gateway to the inner bailey was built. This is now known as the Agricola Tower and on its first floor is the chapel of St Mary de Castro. The chapel contains items of Norman architecture. In the 13th century, during the reign of Henry III, the walls of an outer bailey were built, the gateway in the Agricola Tower was blocked up and residential accommodation, including a Great Hall, was built along the south wall of the inner bailey. Later in the century, during the reign of Edward I, a new gateway to the outer bailey was built. This was flanked by two half-drum towers and had a drawbridge over a moat 8 metres (26 ft) deep. Further additions to the castle at this time included individual chambers for the King and Queen, a new chapel and stables.

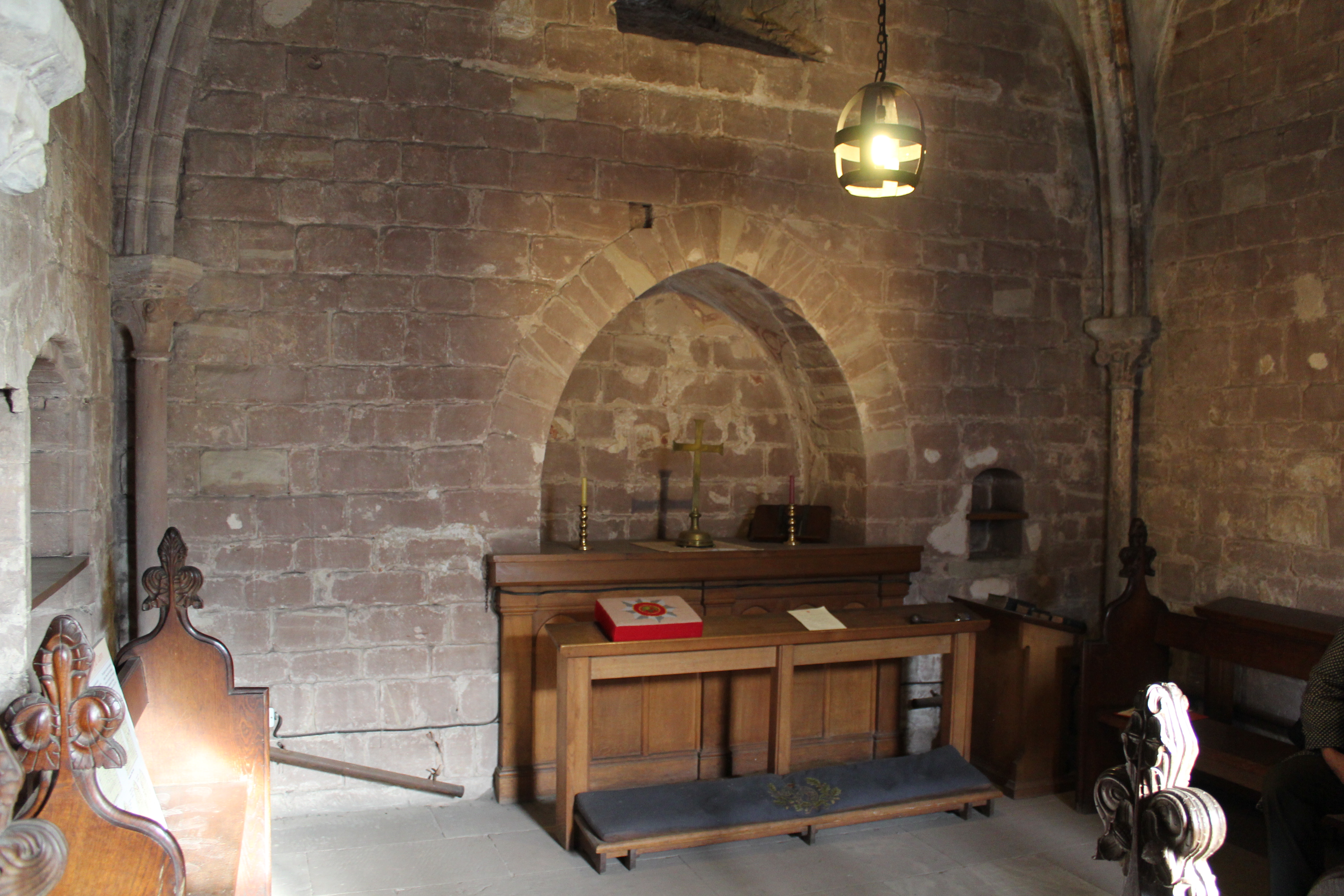
The Norman chapel

Prominent people held as prisoners in the crypt of the Agricola Tower were Richard II and Eleanor Cobham, wife of Humphrey, Duke of Gloucester, and Andrew de Moray, hero of the Battle of Stirling Bridge. During the Wars of the Roses, Yorkist John Neville, 1st Marquess of Montagu was captured and imprisoned at the castle by Lancastrians following the Battle of Blore Heath, near the town of Market Drayton, Shropshire, in 1459. He was released from captivity following the Yorkist victory at Northampton in 1460. Outside the outer bailey gate was an area known as the Gloverstone where criminals waiting for execution were handed over to the city authorities. The Great Hall was rebuilt in the late 1570s.

During the Civil War Chester was held by the Royalists. The castle was assaulted by Parliamentary forces in July 1643, and in January and April 1645. Together with the rest of the city, it was besieged between September 1645 and February 1646. Following the civil war the castle was used as a prison, a court and a tax office. In 1687 James II attended Mass in the chapel of St Mary de Castro. In 1696 Chester mint was established and was managed by Edmund Halley in a building adjacent to the Half Moon tower. During the 1745 Jacobite rising a gun emplacement was built on the wall overlooking the river.

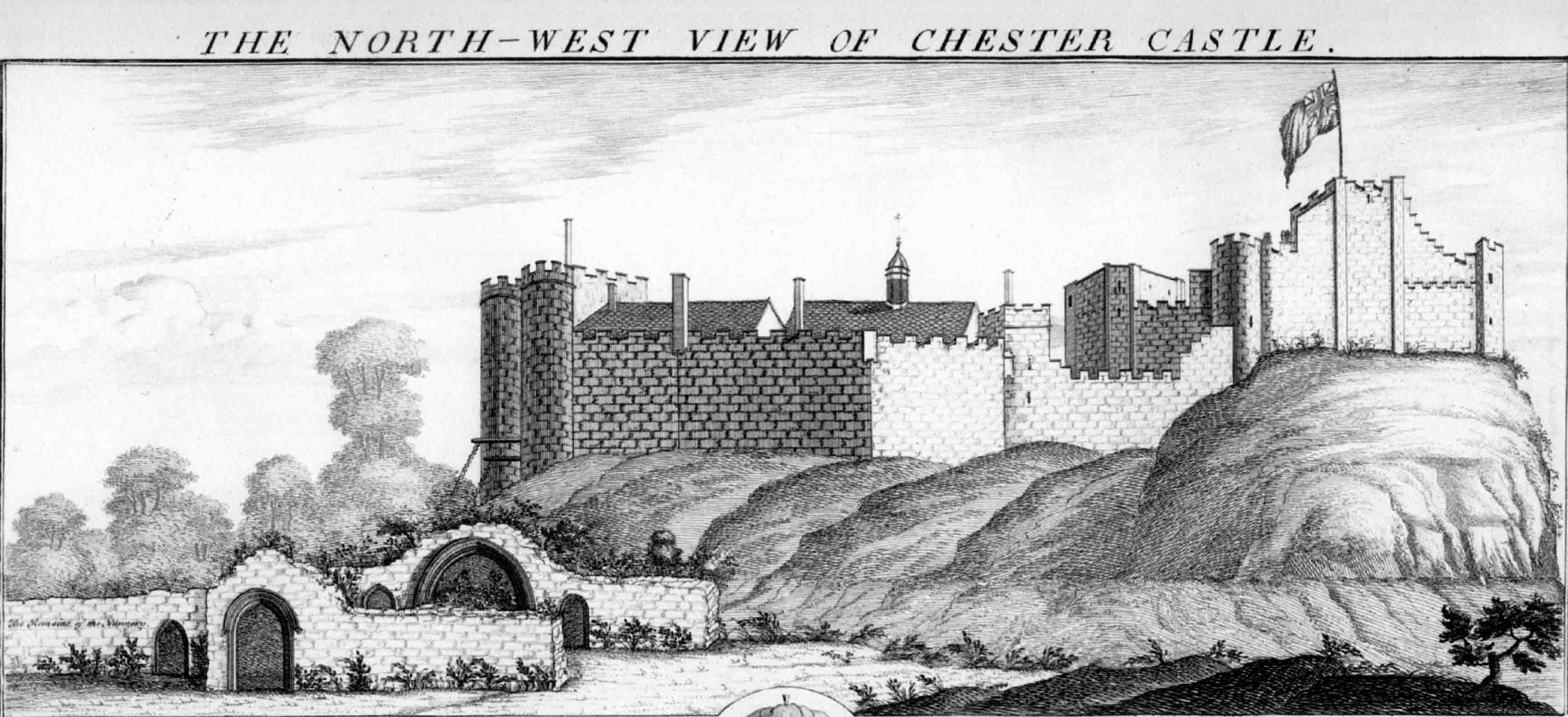
Engraving by Buck Brothers of Chester Castle in 1747

By the later part of the 18th century much of the fabric of the castle had deteriorated and John Howard, the prison reformer, was particularly critical of the conditions in the prison. Thomas Harrison was commissioned to design a new prison. This was completed in 1792 and praised as one of the best constructed prisons in the country. Harrison then went on to rebuild the medieval Shire Hall in neoclassical style. He also built two new wings, one to act as barracks, the other as an armoury, and designed a massive new entrance to the castle site, styled the Propylaeum. The buildings, which were all in neoclassical style, were built between 1788 and 1822. The architectural historian Nikolaus Pevsner comments that Harrison's work constitutes "one of the most powerful monuments of the Greek Revival in the whole of England".

In February 1867, Irish Fenian Michael Davitt led a group of IRB men from Haslingden on an abortive raid for arms on the castle. The Army moved in to take hold of the castle and in 1873 a system of recruiting areas based on counties was instituted under the Cardwell Reforms and the castle became the depot for the two battalions of the 22nd (Cheshire) Regiment of Foot. Under the Childers Reforms, the 22nd regiment evolved to become the Cheshire Regiment with its depot in the castle in 1881.

Towards the end of the 19th century, ghost stories regarding the castle became increasingly common, with reports of “harrowing” screams of a young woman in and surrounding the castle prison, which was in the process of closing at the time. In 1925, after being used for 200 years as a warehouse and ammunition store, the crypt and chapel in the Agricola Tower were reconsecrated by the Bishop of Chester for the use of the Cheshire Regiment. In 1939 the chapel was refurnished. The castle remained the depot of the Cheshire Regiment until 1939, when the regiment moved out to Dale Barracks.

== Present day ==
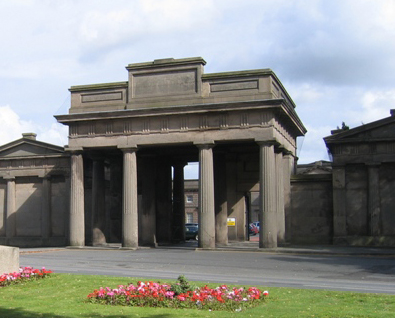
Harrison's Propylaeum, the ceremonial entrance to the Castle

The complex is entered from Grosvenor Road through the Propylaeum, a Grade I listed building. This consists of a massive entablature supported on widely spaced (areostyle) Doric columns, flanked by temple-like lodges. Directly ahead is the former Shire Hall (also listed Grade I) which now houses the Crown Courts. Its façade has 19 bays, the central seven bays of which project forward and constitute a Doric portico. To the left is the former barracks block which is now the home of the Cheshire Military Museum and an army cadet detachment. To the right is the block which was originally an armoury and later an officers' mess. Both blocks are in neoclassical style and are listed Grade I.

Further to the right are the remains of the Norman castle. The Agricola Tower is a Grade I listed building. It is built in sandstone ashlar with a metal roof in three storeys. The ground floor has a blocked gateway and to the right of the gateway is a slightly projecting stair turret. Internally, the ground floor consists of a crypt, and the first floor contains the chapel of St Mary Castro. The Agricola Tower is also a scheduled monument. The chapel is still consecrated as the regimental chapel of the Cheshire Regiment. Its ceiling is covered with frescos dating from the early part of the 13th century which depict the Visitation and miracles performed by the Virgin Mary which were revealed during conservation work in the 1990s.

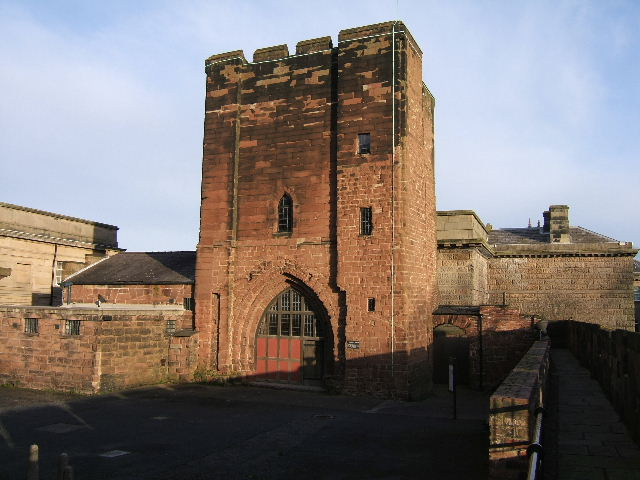
Agricola Tower

To the south and the west, the curtain walls, which include the Halfmoon Tower, the Flag Tower and the gun emplacement, are listed Grade I. Other walls within the castle complex are listed Grade II. These are the retaining walls and the railing of the forecourt designed by Thomas Harrison, and two other areas of the medieval curtain walls. In the castle courtyard is a statue of Queen Victoria dated 1903 by Pomeroy. The inner bailey is managed by Cheshire West and Chester Council on behalf of English Heritage.

== See also ==
- Governor of Chester
- Siege of Chester
- Castles in Great Britain and Ireland
- List of castles in England
- List of castles in Cheshire
- Grade I listed buildings in Cheshire West and Chester
- Listed buildings in Chester Castle parish
- Norman architecture in Cheshire
- List of Scheduled Monuments in Cheshire (1066–1539)
- List of works by Thomas Harrison
