= Monolithic column =

Column where the shaft is a single piece of stone

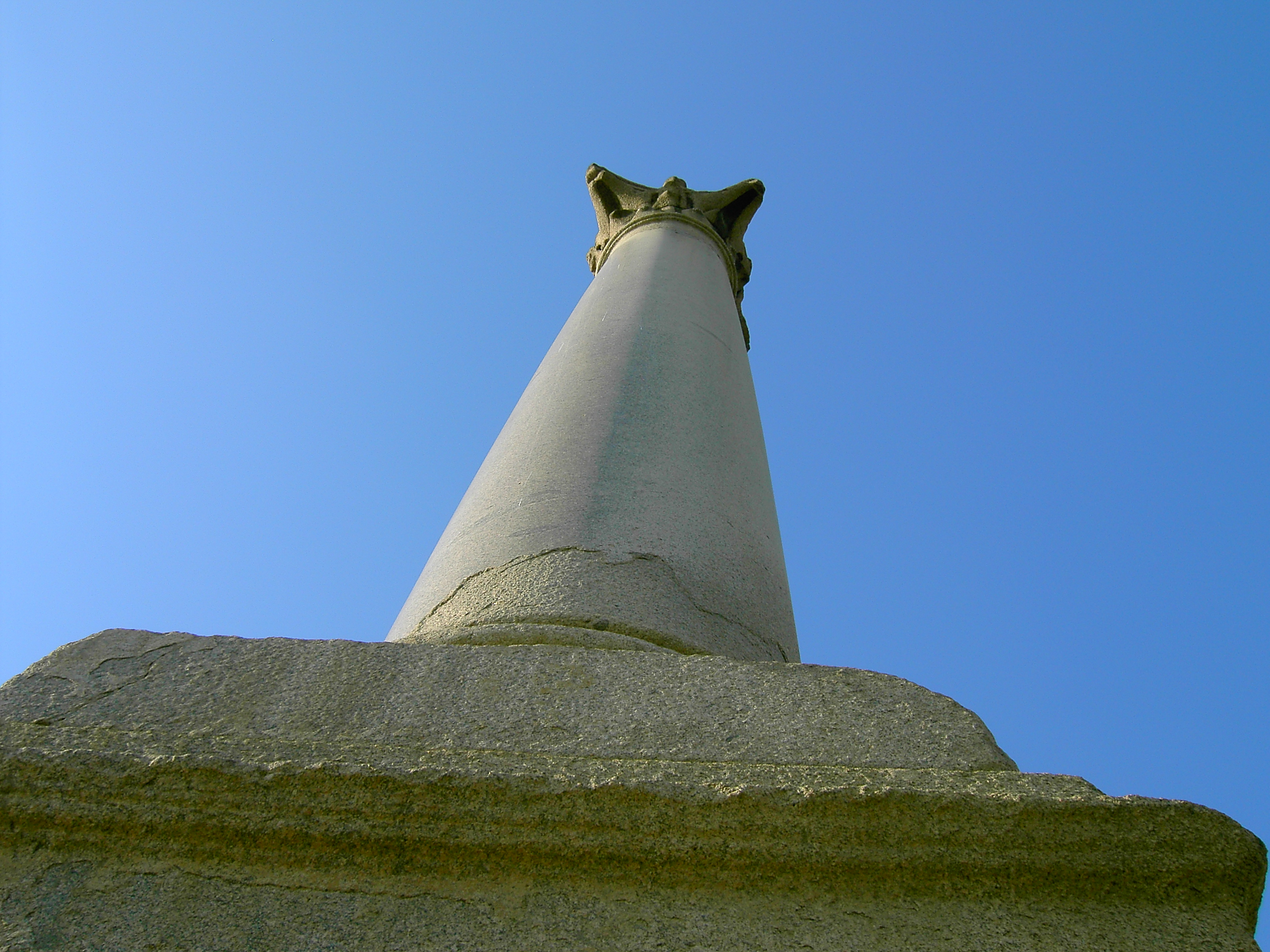
Pompey's Pillar, a Roman monolithic column in Alexandria, Egypt

A monolithic column or single-piece column is a large column of which the shaft is made from a single piece of stone instead of in vertical sections. Smaller columns are very often made from single pieces of stone, but are less often described as monolithic, as the term is normally reserved for less common, larger columns made in this way. Choosing to use monolithic columns produces considerable extra difficulties in quarrying and transport, and may be seen as a statement of grandeur and importance in a building.

As an example of this level of choice, Shoghi Effendi cabled Bahá'ís of the world in 1948 about the Shrine of the Báb on December 10, 1948:

Convey to believers the joyful news of the safe delivery on Mt. Carmel of a consignment of thirty-two granite monolith columns, part of the initial shipment of material ordered for construction of the arcade of the Báb's Sepulcher, designed to envelop and preserve the sacred previous structure reared by 'Abdu'l-Bahá. Building operations are soon starting notwithstanding the difficulties of the present situation. I am supplicating the Almighty's guidance and sustaining grace for successive stages of an enterprise envisaged sixty years ago by Bahá'u'lláh, initiated by the Center of His Covenant, designed to culminate as contemplated by Him in erection of a superstructure to be crowned by a golden dome marking the consummation at the heart of the Mountain of God of the momentous undertaking born through the generating influence of the Will of the Founder of our beloved Faith, so dear to the heart of His blessed Son, and dedicated to the memory of the Martyr-Prophet, the immortal Herald of the Bahá'í Dispensation.

The Shrine of the Báb's monolithic columns are made of rose granite from Baveno.

Monolithic columns are characteristic of Ancient Egyptian temples, and the examples in the portico of the Pantheon in Rome were also transported from Egypt. Byzantine churches in the Theodosian dynasty (379-457 AD) also show use of monolithic columns. Examples of single-piece columns have also been found in architecture from the Yucatán Peninsula.

In modern architecture, using concrete the situation is different, and the term is less likely to be used in this context.

== See also ==
- Mellon Institute of Industrial Research
