= List of public art in Shropshire =

This is a list of public art in the county of Shropshire, England. This list applies only to works of public art on permanent display in an outdoor public space. For example, this does not include artworks in museums.

== Bridgnorth ==
Image	Title / subject	Location and coordinates	Date	Artist / designer	Type	Material	Dimensions	Designation	Owner / administrator	Notes
More images	War memorial	Bridgnorth Town Park, Bridgnorth 52.531423°N 2.419347°W	1920, rededicated 1950	Adrian Jones	Statue on pedestal	Bronze and stone				

== Craven Arms ==
Image	Title / subject	Location and coordinates	Date	Artist / designer	Type	Material	Dimensions	Designation	Owner / administrator	Notes
	Sheep, Rail transport	Craven Arms, Shropshire, UK 52.43936°N 2.8352°W	2005	Malcolm Robertson	Statue					

== Ironbridge ==
Image	Title / subject	Location and coordinates	Date	Artist / designer	Type	Material	Dimensions	Designation	Owner / administrator	Notes
More images	War memorial	High Street, Ironbridge 52.627599°N 2.485034°W	1924	Arthur George Walker	Statue on pedestal	Bronze and stone	Lifesize		Ironbridge Gorge Museum Trust	Depicts a soldier in a World War I uniform
	Ironbridge Coracles	Banks of the River Severn near the Museum of the Gorge, Ironbridge 52.62939°N 2.49189°W	2021	Luke Perry	Sculpture	Steel			Ironbridge Gorge Museum Trust	An image of Tommy Rogers, grandfather to the Gorge's last coracle man, Eustace Rogers, who died in 2002. The design was based on a paper-cut image by Ironbridge resident Dave Fieldhouse. The sculpture is intended to be part of the Ironbridge Coracle Trail.

== Oswestry ==
Image	Title / subject	Location and coordinates	Date	Artist / designer	Type	Material	Dimensions	Designation	Owner / administrator	Notes
	The Borderland Farmer	Church Street (Red Square), Oswestry 52.858020°N 3.056359°W	1990	Ivor Roberts-Jones	Statue	Bronze			Shropshire Council	Bronze statue of a shepherd with a ram, on a dome of rocks.
	Wilfred Owen	Cae Glas Park, Oswestry 52.858281°N 3.05755°W	2018	Tim Turner	Statue	Bronze				
	Red deer	Cae Glas Park, Oswestry 52.858211°N 3.058336°W	2013		Statue					Part of the Oswestry Urban Sculpture Adventure Trail
	Giraffe	Cae Glas Park, Oswestry 52.859394°N 3.057861°W	2013		Statue					Part of the Oswestry Urban Sculpture Adventure Trail
	Mr Mots, Miner	St Martins, Shropshire	2018	George Triggs	Statue	Bronze				

== Shrewsbury ==
Image	Title / subject	Location and coordinates	Date	Artist / designer	Type	Material	Dimensions	Designation	Owner / administrator	Notes
	Charles Darwin	Outside Shrewsbury School 52.703550°N 2.762327°W	2000		Statue	Bronze			Shrewsbury School	
More images	The Quantum Leap	Mardol Quay Gardens, Shrewsbury 52.709452°N 2.757193°W	2009	Pearce & Lal	Sculpture	Stone cast in cement	12 metres high and 17.5 metres long		Shropshire Council	Unveiled to mark Darwin's bicentenary
More images	Darwin Gate	Mardol Head, Shrewsbury 52.707997°N 2.755088°W	2004	Mark Renn & Mick Thacker	Sculpture	cast glass, copper, bronze, stainless steel and stone			Shropshire Council	The starting point of the Darwin Trail
	Darwin Window	Darwin Shopping Centre, Pride Hill, Shrewsbury 52.708870°N 2.752919°W			Stained glass window				The Darwin Shopping Centre	It depicts an animal scene in a clear nod to Charles Darwin who was born in Shrewsbury

=== Shrewsbury Library ===
Image	Title / subject	Location and coordinates	Date	Artist / designer	Type	Material	Dimensions	Designation	Owner / administrator	Notes
More images	Charles Darwin	In front of Shrewsbury Library 52.710401°N 2.750787°W	1897	Horace Montford	Seated statue	Bronze	2.6m high approx	Grade II listed	Shropshire Council	Shrewsbury Library building used to house Shrewsbury School, which Darwin attended as a boy.
More images	Mary Webb	Outside of Shrewsbury Library near Castle Gate 52.71024°N 2.75072°W	July 2016	Jemma Pearson	Bust	Bronze			Shropshire Council	Unveiled on 9th July 2016 by members of the Mary Webb Society and biographer Dr. Gladys Mary Coles.

=== The Quarry ===
Image	Title / subject	Location and coordinates	Date	Artist / designer	Type	Material	Dimensions	Designation	Owner / administrator	Notes
More images	Boer War Memorial	St Chad's Terrace, Shrewsbury 52.706848°N 2.759039°W	1902	Caffin of Regent Street	Statue	Stone		Grade II listed	Shropshire Council	
More images	War Memorial	The Quarry, Shrewsbury 52.707382°N 2.760005°W	1922	George Hubbard and Son, Allan Wyon	Statue	Granite and bronze		Grade II listed	Shropshire Council	
More images	Copy of the Farnese Hercules	The Quarry, Shrewsbury 52.706669°N 2.763520°W	Early 18th Century	John Nost	Statue	Lead	1.6m high approx	Grade II listed	Shropshire Council	Originally at Condover Hall, It was moved to the entrance of The Quarry in 1851. It was later moved to its current position in 1881
More images	Queen Elizabeth The Queen Mother	Queen Mother Centenary Rose Garden, The Quarry, Shrewsbury 52.707931°N 2.759492°W	2001		Sculpture	Bronze			Shropshire Council	

=== Town Centre ===
Image	Title / subject	Location and coordinates	Date	Artist / designer	Type	Material	Dimensions	Designation	Owner / administrator	Notes
More images	Clive of India	Shrewsbury Square, Shrewsbury 52.707785°N 2.754027°W	1860	Carlo Marochetti	Statue	Bronze	2.75m high approx	Grade II listed	Shropshire Council	
	The Spread Eagle emblem	Barclays, 46 Castle Street, Shrewsbury 52.709155°N 2.752039°W			Sculpture				Barclays	
More images	High Cross	Pride Hill junction with St Mary's Street, Shrewsbury 52.708941°N 2.752455°W	1952		High cross	fine white limestone	5.5m high overall, cross 1.21m high approx		Shropshire Council	On the site of earlier crosses. Was the site of execution Present cross was erected to commemorate the 400 years of Shrewsbury School in the town in 1952.
More images	The Lion	The Lion Hotel, Wyle Cop, Shrewsbury 52.706434°N 2.751675°W	1777	John Nelson	Lion sculpture	Stone		Grade I listed	The Lion Hotel	

=== Abbey Gardens ===
Image	Title / subject	Location and coordinates	Date	Artist / designer	Type	Material	Dimensions	Designation	Owner / administrator	Notes
More images	Viscount Hill	Shrewsbury Sixth Form College - Abbey Gardens, Shrewsbury 52.707628°N 2.747131°W	1876	Matthew Noble	Statue	White marble	2m high approx	Grade II listed	Shropshire Council	Unveiled in Abbey Gardens in 1907.

=== Abbey Foregate ===
Image	Title / subject	Location and coordinates	Date	Artist / designer	Type	Material	Dimensions	Designation	Owner / administrator	Notes
More images	Lord Hill's Column	Column Roundabout, Shrewsbury 52.704154°N 2.731780°W	1816	Thomas Harrison, Edward Haycock, John Carline, Jnr and Joseph Panzetta	Statue on top of a column	Coade stone and Grinhill sandstone	5.2m high (statue), 4.57m diameter at pedestal, 68cm thick; 3.2m diameter at capital, 48cm thick (column)	Grade II* listed	Shropshire Council	Monument to Rowland Hill, 1st Viscount Hill
	Symmetry: memorial to Wilfred Owen	Shrewsbury Abbey 52.707877°N 2.742475°W	1994	Paul de Monchaux	Sculpture	Granite and sandstone				Commissioned by the Wilfred Owen Association, to mark the centenary of his birth

== Telford ==
Image	Title / subject	Location and coordinates	Date	Artist / designer	Type	Material	Dimensions	Designation	Owner / administrator	Notes
More images	Trihedral Spire	Naird Roundabout, Telford 52.67068°N 2.41502°W	1984		Roundabout obelisk	Concrete	22 metre high		Telford and Wrekin Council	

=== Ludlow ===
Image	Title / subject	Location and coordinates	Date	Artist / designer	Type	Material	Dimensions	Designation	Owner / administrator	Notes
	Doves of Peace	Market Square, Ludlow.	2000	Walenty Pytel		Bronze	5M			Doves of Peace war memorial 5 metre bronze sculpture. Commissioned by the Ludlow branch of the Royal British Legion. Unveiled by Sir Thomas Raymond Dunne, KG, KCVO, JP. The original model was sold in 2011 at Brightwells Auction by Walenty.
