= Eleanor Coade =

British businesswoman, sculptor (1733–1821)

- Born: 3 June 1733; Exeter, Devon, England
- Died: 18 November 1821 (aged 88); Camberwell, London, England
- Resting place: Bunhill Fields cemetery, London
- Occupations: Business woman, neoclassical statuary sculptor and manufacturer

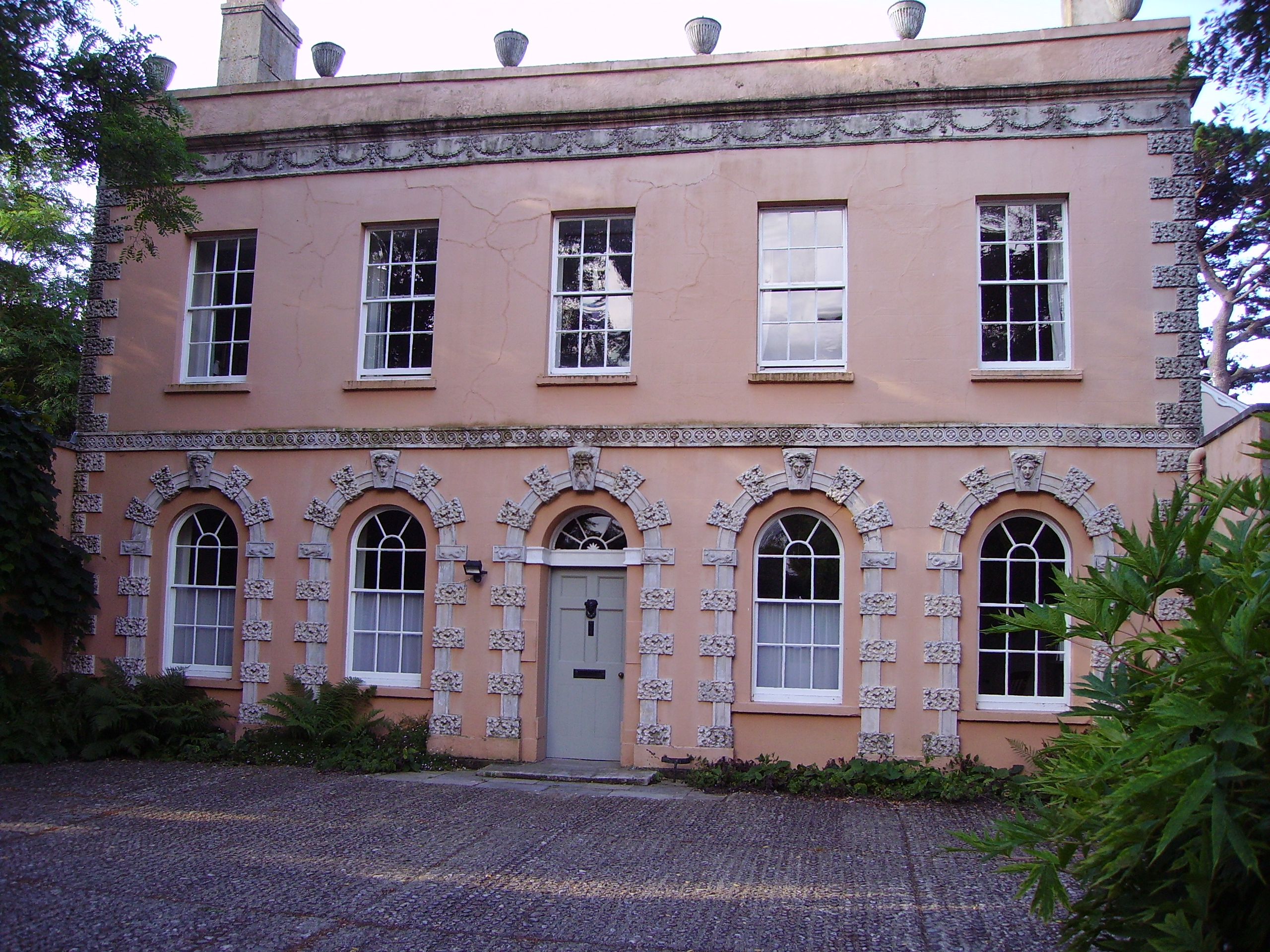
Belmont House in Lyme Regis, Dorset, with Coade stone decoration.

Eleanor Coade (Note: Pronunciation: The display in the Lyme Regis Museum says the surname is pronounced Coode. However, probably the most extensive study undertaken of the Coad/Coade/Code/Coode surname, Joe Flood's "Unravelling the Code: The Coads and Coodes of Cornwall and Devon", states: "There were no COADs prior to about 1600, as far as we know. There were CODEs and COODEs (also pronounced "Code") in Devon and Cornwall ..." (p. 14); and that from about 1520 "the spellings Code and Coode seem to have been used interchangeably ... always with the same pronunciation, Code." "The alternative spelling COADE(E) was unknown until about 1600 ..." (p. 16); and mentions "the most famous Coade, the artist and businesswoman Eleanor Coade ..." (p. 20).) (3 or 24 June 1733 – c.18 November 1821) (Note: First name and birth date: Alison Kelly states on page 21 of Mrs Coade's Stone that she was born as Elinor Coade on 24 June 1733. The display in the Lyme Regis Museum shows the same spelling and "She was born to wealthy parents at Exeter on 24 June 1733.") was a British businesswoman known for manufacturing Neoclassical statues, architectural decorations and garden ornaments made of Lithodipyra (Coade stone) for over 50 years from 1769 until her death. She should not be confused or conflated with her mother, also named Eleanor. (Note: There is some modern confusion between Eleanor and her mother (Eleanor, Elinore), as to which one ran the factory. This is primarily because of Miss Eleanor Coade's customary use of the title Mrs because this was a commonplace 'courtesy title' for any unmarried woman in business. However, analysis of the bills shows that Eleanor Coade (daughter) was fully in charge from 1771. (Alison Kelly (art historian), Oxford National Dictionary of Biography (ONDB)).) (Note: Alison Kelly states on page 23 of Mrs Coade's Stone – "Since mother and daughter had the same name, confusion has reigned over the contribution of each of them to the manufactory. The widow Coade was of course Mrs, and it has been assumed that any mention of Mrs Coade must refer to her. Rupert Gunnis, for instance, believed that the widow ran the factory until her death in her late eighties, in 1796. What is not generally realised is that women in business, in Georgian times, had the courtesy title of Mrs so in the Coade records, it normally refers to Miss Coade. Bills were usually headed Eleanor Coade, but two, as early as 1771, for Hatfield Priory, Essex, and 1773, for work at Burton upon Trent Town Hall, were made out to Miss Coade, showing that from the early days she was in charge. The only references that specifically concern the mother are the first two entries for the factory in the Lambeth poor rate books, when the rate was paid by Widow Coade.") (Note: It appears that the modern identity confusion dates from 1951 (or earlier) when Sir Howard Roberts and Walter H. Godfrey published the Survey of London: volume 23 – Lambeth: South Bank and Vauxhall, and their confusion about the Coade family genealogy led to both gaps and false conclusions. Typically this state of knowledge was then reiterated by Rupert Gunnis in his 1953 Dictionary of British Sculptors, 1660–1851. More recently, the 'British History Online' website has given credence to the otherwise-excellent Roberts and Godfrey Survey of London, and some other internet sites have repeated the claims.) (Note: Her obituary notice, published in The Gentleman's Magazine, declared her the sole inventor and proprietor of an art which deserves considerable notice.)

Lithodipyra ("stone fired twice") was a high-quality, durable moulded weather-resistant, stoneware; statues and decorative features from this still look almost new today. Coade did not invent 'artificial stone', as various inferior quality precursors had been both patented and manufactured over the previous forty years, but she probably perfected both the formulation and the firing process.

She combined high-quality manufacturing and artistic taste, together with entrepreneurial, business and marketing skills, and became a successful businesswoman. She produced stoneware for St George's Chapel, Windsor; The Royal Pavilion, Brighton; Carlton House, London and the Royal Naval College, Greenwich. Shortly after her death, her company produced a large quantity of stoneware used in the refurbishment of Buckingham Palace.

Born in Exeter to two families of wool merchants and weavers, she ran her business, "Coade's Artificial Stone Manufactory", "Coade and Sealy" and latterly "Coade" (by appointment to King George III and the Prince Regent), for fifty years in Lambeth, London. A devout Baptist, she died unmarried in Camberwell.

In 1784 an uncle, Samuel Coade, gave her Belmont House, a holiday villa in Lyme Regis, her late father's town of origin. She decorated the house extensively with Coade stone.

== Personal life ==
=== Early life ===
Eleanor Coade was born on 3 June 1733 in Exeter, the elder daughter of the Nonconformist (devout Baptist) family of George and Eleanor Coade. George Coade (1706–1769) was a wool merchant originally from Lyme Regis, and his wife Eleanor (Elinore, née Enchmarch) (c.1708–1796) was the daughter of Thomas and Sarah Enchmarch (d.1735), merchants and textile manufacturers of Tiverton, Devon. Eleanor's younger sister Elizabeth was born 1738 in Exeter.

Eleanor's maternal grandmother Sarah Enchmarch was a successful business woman in Tiverton, running the family textile business for 25 years after her husband Thomas died in 1735. Since the Middle Ages, the town had been a centre of the woollen textile business, with thousands of workers. Mrs Enchmarch employed 200 people making cloth, and used spies to learn the latest techniques used in Norwich. She was known to travel around Tiverton in a sedan chair. In 1749, with revenues from her business, she re-built the Enchmarch mansion.

=== Later life ===
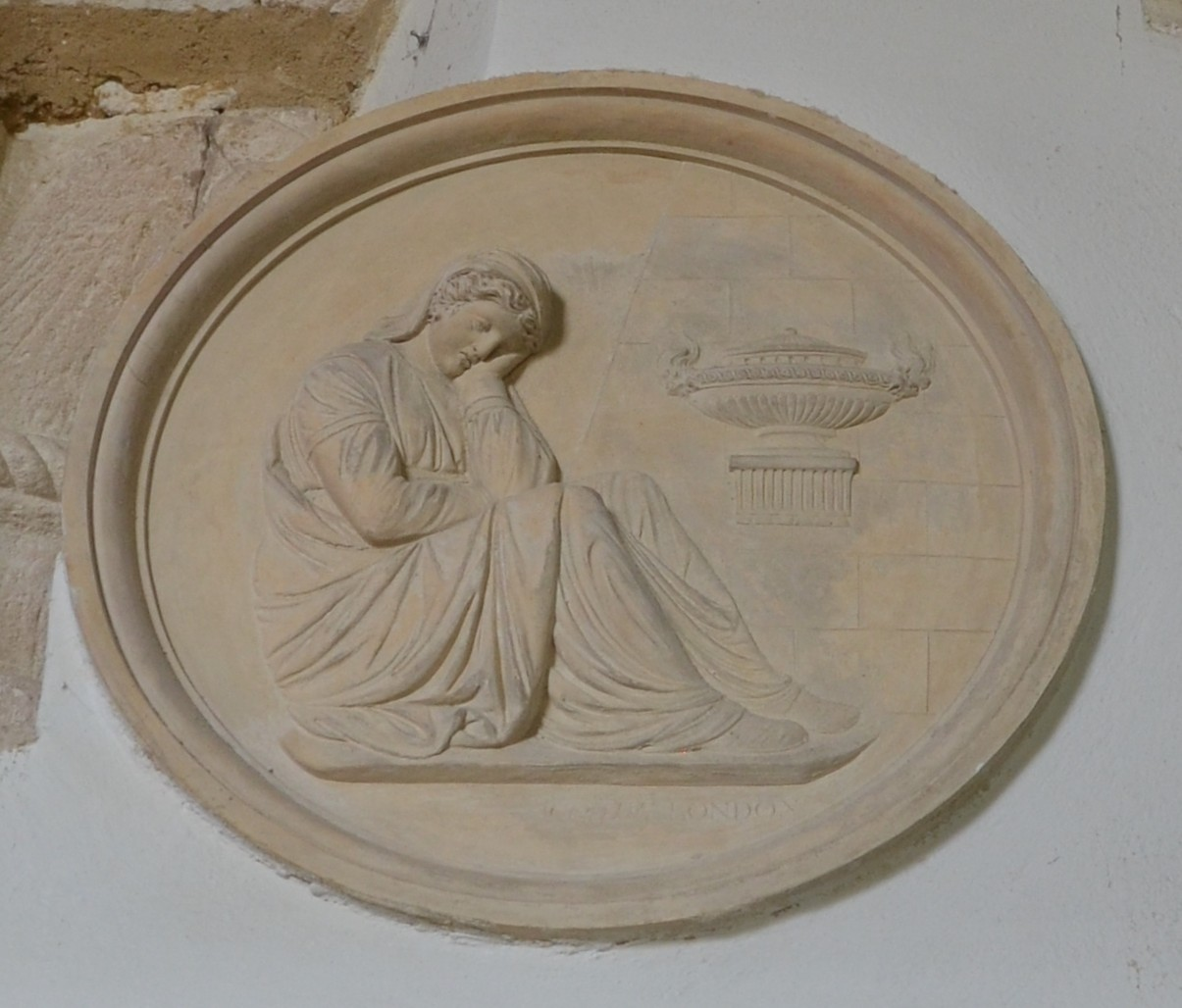
Plaque by Eleanor Coade in St Nicholas' Church, Bramber, West Sussex

About 1760, following George Coade's bankruptcy, the Coade family moved from Exeter to London. By the mid-1760s, daughter Eleanor Coade was running her own business as a linen draper in the City of London. As was customary for unmarried women in business at the time, she used Mrs as a courtesy title.

In early 1769 the family were living at St Thomas Apostles Street when her father George Coade died that year, after having gone bankrupt for the second time. From around 1769, when the daughter Eleanor Coade bought an artificial stone factory, she lived on the factory premises at Narrow Wall, Lambeth. Bills show that she was directly managing the factory by 1771 at the latest.

In 1784 Eleanor Coade was given Belmont House, Lyme Regis, Dorset, by her uncle Samuel Coade. It had been built in 1774 by Simon Bunter, an attorney at law from Axminster. It was a simple two-storey Georgian seaside villa known as Bunter's Castle but renamed Belmont House by the Coade family. Author John Fowles lived there from 1968 to 2005 and it is now owned by the Landmark Trust.

By 1811 Coade was living in Great Surrey Street (later Blackfriars Road), Southwark. At the time of her death in 1821 she was living in Camberwell Grove, Camberwell, London.

=== Exhibition of sculpture ===
Eleanor Coade exhibited at the Society of Artists between 1773 and 1778 and in 1780, as listed in their exhibitors’ catalogue: however, whilst she was listed by the society as a sculptor, Caroline Stanford has suggested that whether the sculptures "were works modelled by herself or produced in her name is still unclear – the documentary evidence implies the latter".

"COADE, Miss Eleanor ... Sculptor. Society of Artists. Artificial Stone Manufactory, Kings-Arms Stairs, Lambeth.

1773

- 59 A figure of Urania, for a sun-dial.

1774

- 53 A chimney piece, in artificial stone, for a nobleman's hall. From a design of Mr. Johnson's.
- 54 A vestal and pedestal; in artificial stone.
- 55 A sybyl; in artificial stone.
- 367 A statue and pedestal for a candalabrum.
- 368 A tripod.

1775

- 385 A Flora; in artificial stone.
- 386 A Pomona.
- 387 A Candalabrum.
- 388 A Tripod and Pedestal.

1776

- 193 A Naiad.
- 194 Three statues for Candalabrums.
- 196 Phrygian Boy and Girl; a Tablet.
- 197 Boy and Dolphin. Mrs, Coade, Artificial Stone Manufactory, Kings' Arms Stairs, Lambeth.

1777

- 181 A Vase, after the Antique, in the Villa Medici.
- 182 A Lion.
- 183 Hymen and Psyche; two figures for Candalabrums.
- 184 A statue of Flora.
- 185 A statue of Pomona.
- 186 A statue of Minerva.
- 187 A statue of a Sybil.

1778

- 284 Charity; in artificial stone.
- 285 A Lion; in artificial stone.
- 286 A Group of Figures; executed for the Marine Society.
- 287 A Figure for Candalabrum.
- 288 A Vase, intended for a monumental inscription.
- 289 A Pedestal, from a design of James Paine, Esq., intended for a sundial.

1780

- 47 Statue of Time; in artificial stone.
- 48 A clock case; in artificial stone.

=== Death and commemoration ===
From Eleanor Coade's will:
I ELEANOR COADE of Great Surrey Street, Blackfriars Road in the parish of Christchurch in the County of Surrey, Spinster, in the fear of God who has blessed my labours amidst many afflictions to the accumulating some property which I now consider as a talent to be rendered back to Him whenever he shall see fit to remove me to that better inheritance which through the aboundings of his Grace in Christ he has enabled me as a chief sinner to hope for, pressed down with favours innumerable it is my desire to glorify him in the following distribution. But first I entreat those of my relatives who will share less than others not to impute the difference to want of affection but to their own different situations and other existing circumstances which give some of them a claim to more special notice and as none of them do rank with the absolutely poor of the land. The Lord's poor and the spread of his Gospel will be allowed by those who know the worth of it so have a powerful demand on the heart of a ransomed sinner.

— Coade/Coode Family History, by Joe Flood, 2007

Eleanor Coade was a devout Baptist. She never married and died on 18 November 1821 in Camberwell Grove, Camberwell, London. Her obituary notice was published in The Gentleman's Magazine, which declared her 'the sole inventor and proprietor of an art which deserves considerable notice'. Although it extolled the virtues of Coade Stone, the obituary contained no reference to her private life.

In her will and testament, Coade left much of her fortune to charity schools and clergymen, plus her family. A proponent of women's rights, she also left money to a few married women friends, stating that their husbands were to have no control over the funds.

Her body is buried in an unmarked grave at Bunhill Fields cemetery in the London Borough of Islington, which was used by many Nonconformists.

She is commemorated by the Coade Stone, placed under Westminster Bridge alongside the footpath to Royal Festival Hall, which now occupies the site of her factory at "Narrow Wall". The Coade Stone is the bottom stone of a horse-mill used in her factory, a wheel-shaped millstone with a prominent internal axle lip. It is placed on a 30-degree slope beside the under-bridge footpath.

== Artificial stone business ==
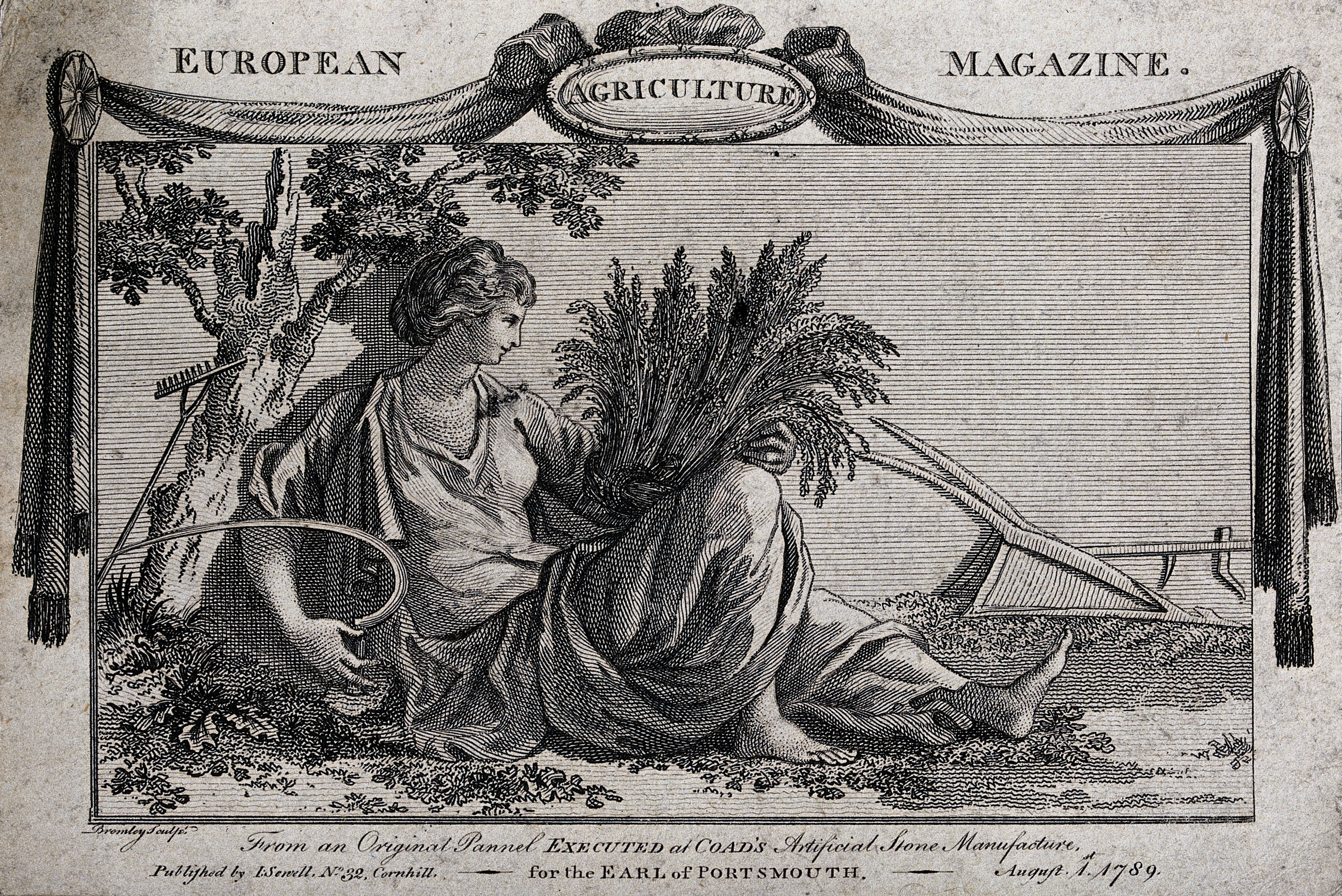
An allegory of agriculture: Ceres reclining amidst a collection of farm implements, she holds a sheaf of wheat and a scythe. Engraving by W. Bromley, 1789, after a sculptural panel by Mrs E. Coade.

In late 1769, at the age of 36, Eleanor Coade bought Daniel Pincot's struggling artificial stone business at Kings Arms Stairs, Narrow Wall, Lambeth, a site now occupied by the Royal Festival Hall. She took charge and developed this business as "Coade's Artificial Stone Manufactory". Within two years (1771), she sacked Pincot for "representing himself as the chief proprietor". The ceramic stoneware product was marketed as "Coade's Lithodipyra", for the next 50 years.

Pincot's business may have been related to that run nearby by Richard Holt, who had taken out two patents in 1722: one for a kind of liquid metal or stone, and another for making china without the use of clay. There were many start-up 'artificial stone' businesses in the early 18th century, of which only Mrs Coade's succeeded. She manufactured products from ceramic in a process to look like stone, and it proved highly durable.

John Bacon, a talented sculptor, had worked for Mrs Coade since 1769. In 1771 she appointed him as works supervisor; he directed both model-making and design until his death in 1799. His neo-classical models won awards from the Society for the Encouragement of Arts and royal patronage. Their joint success meant that the Coade Artificial Stone Manufactory gained the business of all the eminent Georgian architects, including Robert Adam, James Wyatt, Samuel Wyatt, Sir William Chambers, John Nash, and John Soane. Throughout this period of the late 18th century, Mrs Coade also employed designers and modellers such as John Devaere (John De Vaere (1755–1830)) before he joined Josiah Wedgwood in 1790,), John Charles Felix Rossi, J. G. Bubb, Thomas Dubbin, Benjamin West (later a successful painter), and Joseph Panzetta (1789–1830). The latter worked for Coade for more than 26 years; his most prominent work was Lord Hill's Column in Shrewsbury.

After 1780 Coade was commissioned by King George III to make the Gothic screen (and possibly also replace part of the ceiling) of St George's Chapel, Windsor Castle.

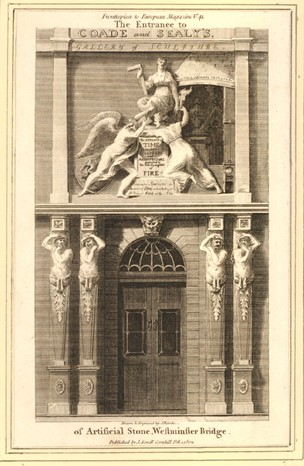
Coade and Sealy's Gallery of Sculpture, Westminster Bridge, 1799. (Engraving of the entrance to the premises by S. Rawle in 1802.)

In 1784 she created a comprehensive catalogue of 746 designs produced by the company. It included statues; busts; whole panels; friezes; fascia; medallions; paterae; coats of arms; balusters; pinnacles; chimneypieces; furniture; interior ornaments; and mouldings. As ceramic moulds could be reused, some had a working life of over 50 years, leading to high efficiency in production.

In 1799 Mrs Coade recruited her cousin John Sealy as a partner in her business. (He was the son of her mother's sister Mary Enchmarch Sealy.) The company then traded as 'Coade and Sealy' until his death, aged 64, in October 1813, when it reverted to 'Coade'. She also opened a show room, Coade's Gallery, on Pedlar's Acre at the Surrey end of Westminster Bridge Road to display her products.

In 1813 Coade recruited William Croggon as manager to succeed Sealy; he was a sculptor from Grampound in Cornwall. (He was a distant cousin by marriage, the brother-in-law of Coade's cousin William Oke, son of her aunt Frances (née Enchmarch)), Croggon worked as manager until Coade's death.

At that time, he bought the firm from her estate for circa £4,000, although he had hoped to inherit it. From 1814 onwards, Croggon paid rates for the factory. The business continued to be successful long after Coade's death, but Croggon went bankrupt in 1833 because of both changing tastes and the failure of the Duke of York to pay his debts.

== Business methods ==
Coade's success as a businesswoman was very rare in the Georgian era. She was a hard-working individual who concentrated on methodical procedures to produce consistently high quality products. She was the first and only person to succeed in the artificial stone business, thanks to a combination of managerial skills, entrepreneurial flair, and a talent for marketing and public relations.

She closely supervised both the preparation of clay mixtures and the firing process for all her products. Within two years of buying the business, she sacked Pincot, the former owner, for disciplinary reasons. She published adverts for her business on 11 and 14 September 1771 in The Daily Advertiser, Gazetteer and The New Daily Advertiser.

She cultivated strong business relationships with respected architects and designers, as she could produce multiple copies of their designs. Her success may be gauged by Josiah Wedgwood's complaint that he "could not get architects to endorse his new chimney-piece plaques".

== Coade stone business ==
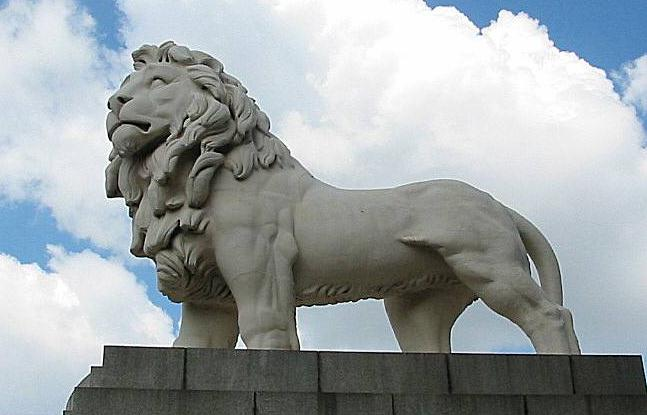
The South Bank Lion, on Westminster Bridge. Modelled by William F. Woodington and Grade II* listed by English Heritage

The factory produced large ceramic statues and all manner of decorative architectural features, which proved to be extremely durable. This material resisted corrosion by London's polluted air, made damaging by coal exhausts, formation of acid rain, and byproducts.

Coade stone works included the frontispiece of the original Twinings shop (tea merchants) on the Strand; private ornaments in the rear of Buckingham Palace; the lion on Westminster Bridge; the Nelson Pediment at the Royal Naval College at Greenwich (the mural above the terrace's main entrance was reckoned by the Coade workers as the finest of all their work); the statue of George III on the seafront at Weymouth, Dorset; the stone awning and statues at Schomberg House, Pall Mall, London; and the crest on the Imperial War Museum. The plaques at Hammerwood Park near East Grinstead were also made of Coade stone.
