= Alison Kelly =

Alison Kelly may refer to:

- Alison Kelly (art historian) (1913–2016), English art historian and authority on Coade stone and Wedgwood pottery
- Alison Kelly (diplomat) (born 1953), Irish diplomat and ambassador
