= Alison Kelly (art historian) =

English art historian (1913–2016)

Avery Allison Kelly
- Born: 17 October 1913
- Died: 15 August 2016 (aged 102)
- Occupation: art historian

Avery Alison Kelly, FSA, (17 October 1913 – 15 August 2016) was an English art historian who was an authority on Coade stone and Wedgwood pottery. During the Second World War she designed camouflage for the home front and later she lectured in London on the fine arts and wrote several books on Wedgwood.

== Early life and education ==
Avery Alison Kelly was born into a Quaker family in Liverpool on 17 October 1913, the only child of Sir Robert Kelly, the professor of surgery at the University of Liverpool and his wife Averill Edith Irma. Her father collected furniture and glass, and was an accomplished photographer, all areas reflected in Alison's later interests. She was educated at Manor House School, Surrey, and then at crammers before entering Lady Margaret Hall, Oxford University, in 1933 where she read English. She then spent a year at the Liverpool City School of Art after which she worked in stage design at the Westminster Theatre.

== Career ==
During the Second World War, Kelly was employed at the camouflage unit in Leamington Spa to devise camouflage schemes for factories and other possible targets for German bombers, being obliged to fly around the country for the work in the care of whichever pilots were available during war-time conditions.

In 1956, Kelly moved to Holland Park in London where she cared for her widowed mother and lectured at the City Literary Institute, Workers' Educational Association, the Design Centre, the London University Extramural Department and elsewhere on topics such as the architecture of Christopher Wren and the history of English furniture. She wrote for Apollo, The Burlington Magazine, Connoisseur, and Country Life and Antiques. She wrote three books on Wedgwood and a self-published book on Coade stone. She took many of the photographs for her books herself. She appeared as a contestant on the television quiz show Mastermind in which her specialist subject was again Wedgwood.

She was a leading figure in the Furniture History Society, and a member of the Society of Architectural Historians, the Georgian Group, the Church Monuments Society, the English Ceramics Circle and the Wedgwood Society, as well as the Royal Society of Arts.

Kelly developed a great interest in the life of Eleanor Coade, the inventor of Coade stone, who like her was an independent woman and a self-starter. She studied Belmont House in Lyme Regis where Coade had once lived and entered into a correspondence of years about Coade with the author John Fowles, the then owner of the house.

== Death ==
Kelly died at her home in London on 15 August 2016. She never married.

== Selected publications ==
- The story of Wedgwood. Faber and Faber, London, 1962.
- Decorative Wedgwood in architecture and furniture. Country Life, 1965.
- The Book of English Fireplaces. Country Life, 1968.
- Wedgwood ware. Ward Lock, London, 1970. ISBN 978-0706318906
- Mrs Coade's stone. Self Publishing Association, Upton-upon-Severn, 1990. ISBN 9781854210555
