= Joseph Panzetta =

Italian sculptor

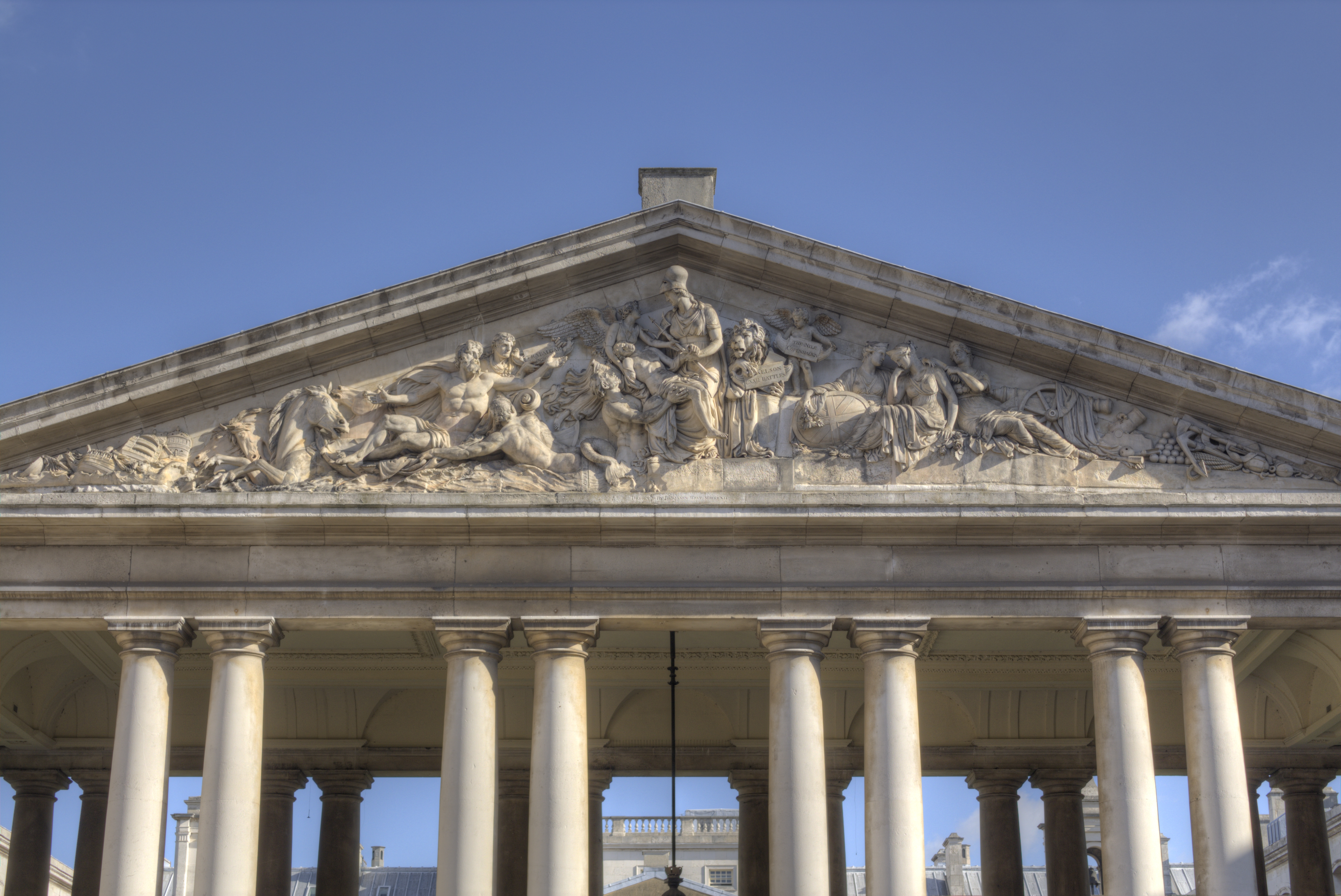
Nelson Pediment, Old Royal Naval College, Greenwich

Joseph Panzetta was an Italian sculptor and modeller who worked in England from c.1787–1830 and exhibited at Royal Academy from 1789–1810. He worked for Mrs Eleanor Coade at her Coade Ornamental Stone Manufactory for over 26 years and modelled in Lithodipyra (Coade stone). His finest and most significant works include: the Admiral Lord Nelson's Pediment at the Royal Naval College, Greenwich; and the 5.2 metre statue of Lord Rowland Hill, 1st Viscount Hill, in Shrewsbury that stands atop Lord Hill's Column, the tallest Doric column in Great Britain.

== Career ==
An article in Dictionary of British Sculptors 1660–1851 records: “Panzetta, Joseph, active from c.1787-1830. Exhibited at Royal Academy from 1789-1810. Worked for Mrs Coade over 26 years. ”

== Works ==
=== Nelson's Pediment - Royal Naval College ===
Admiral Lord Nelson's Pediment in the King William Courtyard of the Old Royal Naval College, Greenwich - was regarded by the Coade workers as the finest of all their work. It was sculpted by Joseph Panzetta in 1813, as a public memorial after his death at the Battle of Trafalgar in 1805. It was based on a painting by Benjamin West depicting Nelson's body being offered to Britannia by a Winged Victory. The cost of the work at Greenwich, which included many figures, was £2,584.

The pediment pictured bears the inscription "Designed by Benjamin West MDCCCXII" (1812).

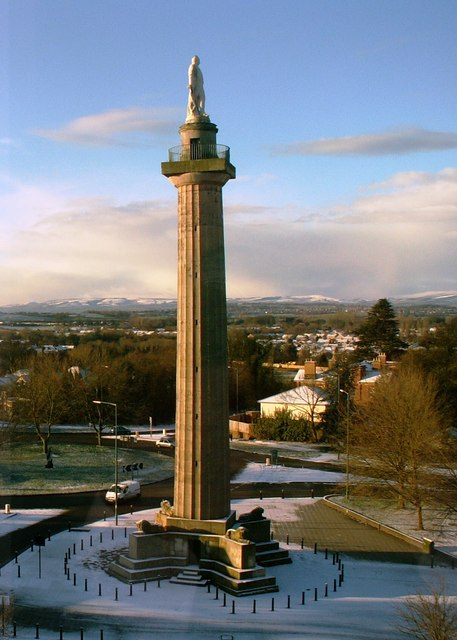
The Column from the Shirehall

=== Lord Hill's Column, Shrewsbury ===
Lord Hill's Column, outside the Shropshire Council headquarters, is one of the most notable landmarks of the town of Shrewsbury, Shropshire, England. It was modelled by Joseph Panzetta.

In an article in the Dictionary of National Biography (2008) Alison Kelly implies that the statue of Lord Hill in Shrewsbury, at circa 16 feet tall was the largest single figure ever ordered in Coade stone. It cost £315, a very considerable sum in 1816.

=== Other works ===
His works include figures of Nelson, Neptune and Britannia.

The cost of Panzetta’s work, with others, at Buckingham Palace, which involved many figures, was £1,386.
