= Lord Hill's Column =

Doric column monument in Shrewsbury, England

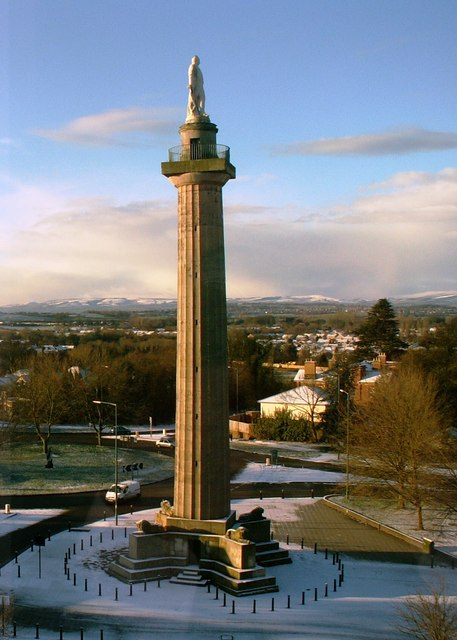
- Lord Hill's Column, Shrewsbury
- Interactive map of Lord Hill's Column
- Location: Shrewsbury, Shropshire
- Coordinates: 52.7041°N 2.7318°W
- Designer: Edward Haycock Sr., Thomas Harrison (architect), Joseph Panzetta, John Carline
- Type: Victory column
- Material: Grinshill Stone and Coade Stone
- Height: 133 feet 6 inches (40.69 m)
- Beginning date: 1814
- Completion date: 1816
- Dedicated to: Rowland Hill, 1st Viscount Hill

Lord Hill's Column is a monument located outside of Shropshire Council's headquarters, Shirehall, in the town of Shrewsbury, Shropshire. It is a column of the Doric order and measures 133 ft 6 in (40.7 m) in height. It commemorates General Rowland Hill, 1st Viscount Hill, with a 17 ft (5.2 m) tall statue standing on the top of the column. The column is shorter than the 44.5m 'Monument to British Liberty' at Gibside, but the combined height of the column and statue is higher in total. The column was built between 1814 and 1816; its diameter is 2 ft (0.6 m) wider than Nelson's Column, and, not including the pedestal, is 15 ft (4.6 m) higher.

== History ==
The architect was Edward Haycock Snr, with modifications mainly to the pedestal by Thomas Harrison. The pedestal is square with a pier of buttress at each angle, on which are placed recumbent lions, worked of Grinshill stone (the same as the column) by John Carline of Shrewsbury. The statue of Lord Hill was modelled in Lithodipyra (Coade stone) by Joseph Panzetta who worked for Eleanor Coade.

The first stone was laid on 27 December 1814 by the Salopian Lodge of Free Masons assisted by deputies from adjoining lodges, on the festival of St. John the Evangelist. The last stone was laid on 18 June 1816, the first anniversary of the Battle of Waterloo. The total expense was 5,972 pounds, 13 shillings and 2 pence (appx. £343,012.16 at 2017 prices).

In 1817, a cantilevered spiral staircase of 172 steps was constructed inside of the column. Each of the 172 balusters carries on its stem a circular medallion on which are cast a letter or letters in upper and lower case spelling out the message: 'This staircase was the gift of John Straphen, the builder, as his donation towards erecting this Column. The first stone of the foundation was laid December 27, 1814, and completed June 18th, 1816, the anniversary of the glorious battle of Waterloo.'

Following his death in 1842, Lord Hill bequeathed five guineas per annum to the person in charge of the column, ten guineas per annum for lighting it and a further ten guineas per annum to "the person who has charge of such light".

The structure once stood at the centre of the crossroads there, but the junction is now set aside from the column. Originally, the base of the column was surrounded by an iron railing, however this was later removed. The column also gives its name to a ward of the Shrewsbury Town Council, known simply as "Column" ward and to the Bayston Hill, Column and Sutton ward of Shropshire Council. It is possible to climb within the column using steps to reach the top.

== Recent history ==
The column has been listed by English Heritage as a Grade II* structure.

In early 2013, the column's state deteriorated following harsh winter weather and heavy winds. Falling debris from the statue resulted in it being cordoned off to the public. In May 2013, Shropshire Council sought the best solution to the falling debris from the statue caused by heavy winds. As a landmark of historical significance for Shrewsbury, its preservation and restoration was said by some, such as English Heritage, to be of paramount importance. Work to restore the column totalled £350,000.

Following restoration work, the column was opened to the public during the summer and autumn of 2015 as part of the bicentenary of the Battle of Waterloo. The Column was also open in 2016 thanks to the work of the Friends of Lord Hill's Column.

In March 2019, the statue of Lord Hill was again found to have suffered damage as a result of strong winds and freezing weather. An inspection revealed that the damage was not as bad as was witnessed in 2013. Repair work was planned to commence between May and June at a cost of £10,000, however this was pushed back to autumn 2019 and was again delayed until a future date. The work was set to commence in May 2020. Talks began in June 2019 between Shropshire Council and Friends of Lord Hill Column regarding the construction of a £500,000 replacement statue.

In March 2021, Shropshire Council announced they were seeking a specialist consultant to lead a fundraising drive in order to raise the £500,000 needed to construct a replica statue. Should such a statue be created, it was expected to be erected by 2022 in order to mark the 250th anniversary of Lord Hill's birth.

On 3 May 2022, protest group Extinction Rebellion unfurled a 20m long banner from the top of the column bearing the words 'Climate Crisis Act Now'.

== See also ==
- Listed buildings in Shrewsbury (outer areas)
- List of works by Thomas Harrison
- Tenantry Column – Doric column in Alnwick, Northumberland
- Perry's Victory and International Peace Memorial – Doric column in Put-in-Bay. Ohio. Tallest Doric column in the world.
