= Shrewsbury Library =

Public library in Shrewsbury, England

Coordinates: 52°42′38″N 2°45′3″W

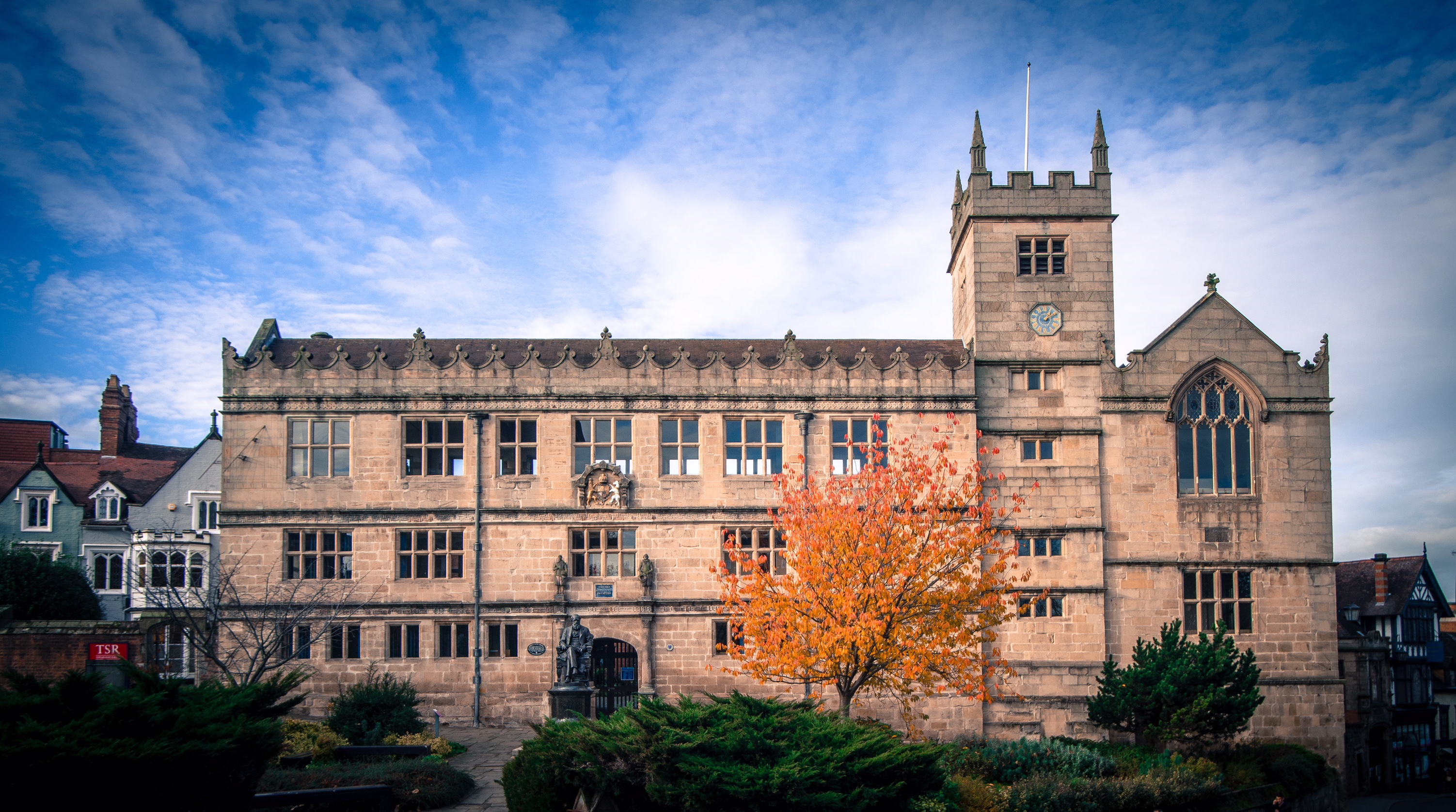
Front view of Shrewsbury Town Library

Shrewsbury Library is housed in a Grade I listed building situated on Castle Gates near Shrewsbury Castle. The site was the home of Shrewsbury School from 1550 until 1882. The buildings were handed over to the town in 1882 and a free library and museum were opened by the Corporation of Shrewsbury utilizing the building in 1885. The library was moved temporarily to Raven Meadows in 1976 while the site on Castle Gates underwent extensive restorations. The library was re-opened in 1983 by Princess Margaret.

Above the main entrance are two statues bearing the inscriptions "Philomathes" and "Polumathes". These represent students, one coming to learn and the other a learned scholar on leaving. The inscription below is from Isocrates and reads "If you are a lover of learning, you will become learned".

== History of the building ==
The original school was founded by Royal charter by King Edward VI in 1552. This is a timber-frame building, now at the rear of the present building. Additional stone buildings were added from 1594 to 1630, including a chapel, dormitories, library and classrooms. The school continued in these, until it was relocated in 1882. Subsequently the premises were converted to a public "Free Library and Museum" by the Shrewsbury Borough Council, opening in their new role in 1885. In the twentieth century the library purpose gradually took over the building. After a period of structural deterioration, followed by extensive restoration work, the buildings were re-opened entirely as Shrewsbury Public Library in 1983.

A plaque erected by The Rotary Club of Shrewsbury, commemorating the club's 60th anniversary in 1986, reads: Castle Gates Library. Founded by Edward VI in 1552, Shrewsbury School occupied this site until 1882. The stone buildings were built 1594-1630. Sir Philip Sidney, Judge Jeffreys and Charles Darwin were educated here. Re-opened as a library in 1983 after complete renovation.

== Restoration work ==
The building required restoration work which was mainly done in the early 1980s. The projected cost was over £3 million, one of the most expensive such works ever undertaken by Shropshire County Council. The library opened in 1983. The work included sand-blasting the main stonework, which looks more modern than 1630 as a result. Work was also done on the original timber-framed building, including repairs to the roof gables. Carvings were done by a local craftsman in the original Tudor style. These include a self-portrait at the apex of the north-facing gable.

== Gallery ==
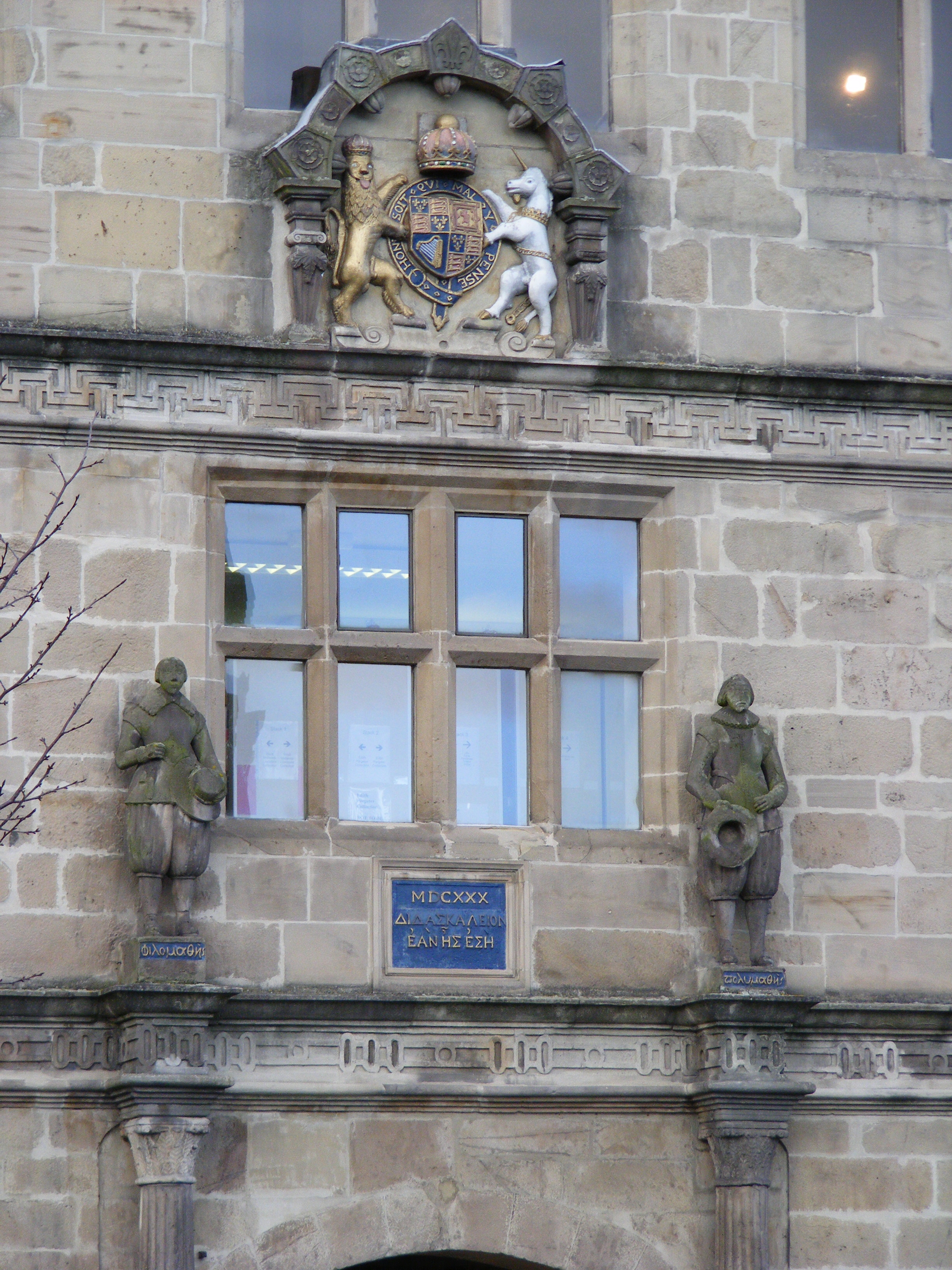
Carvings above entrance archway

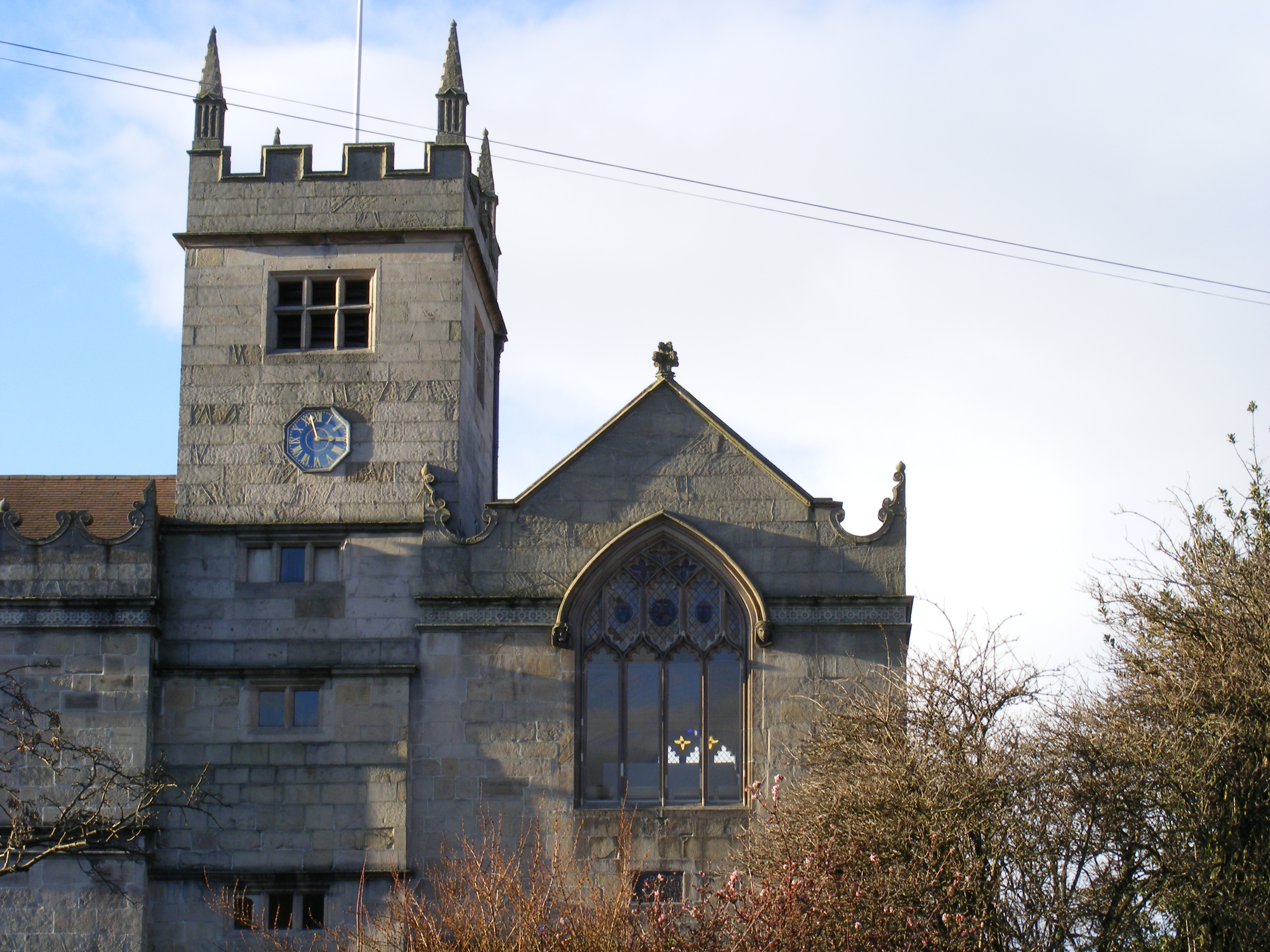
Tower and north hall

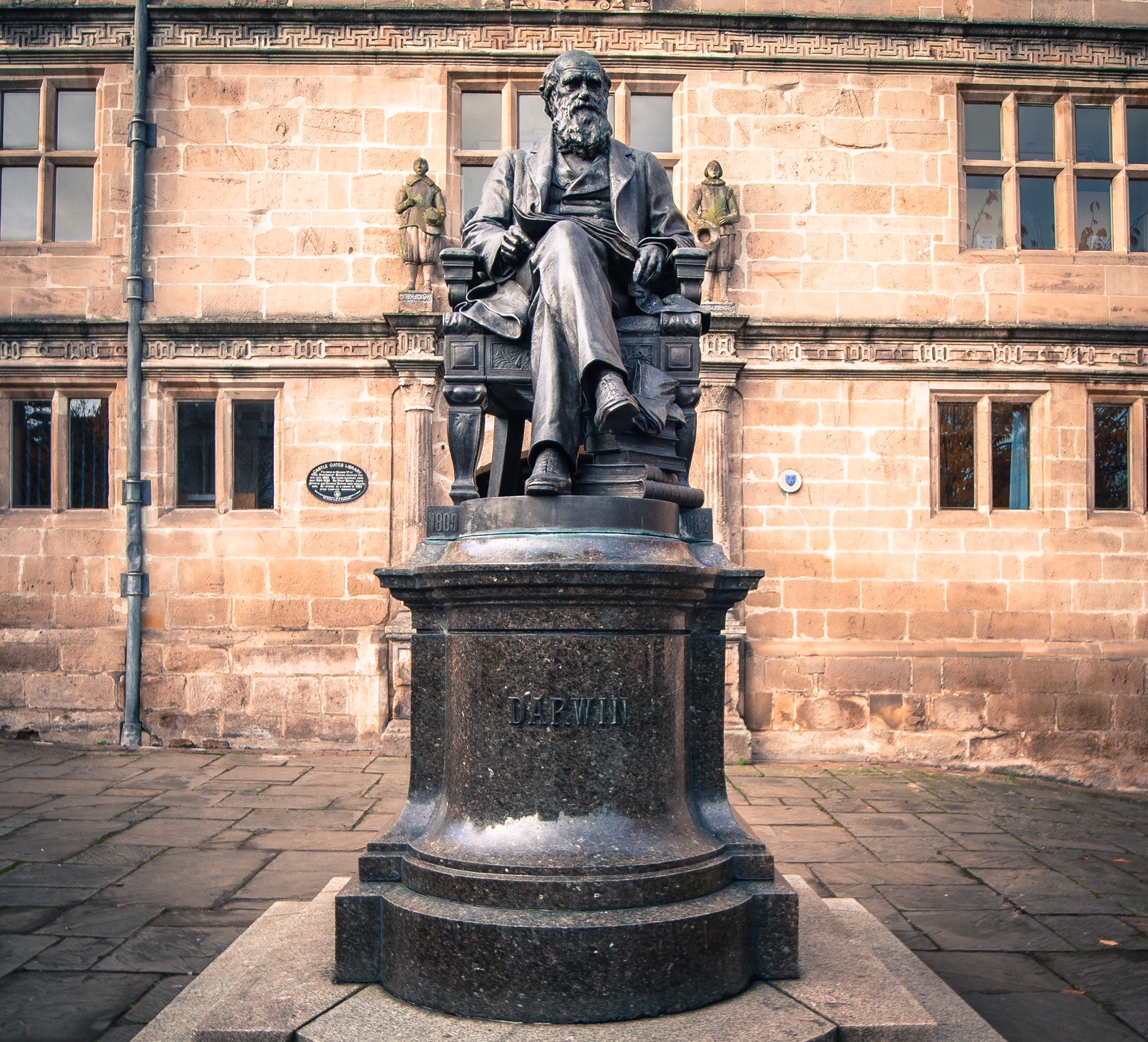
Charles Darwin Statue outside front entrance

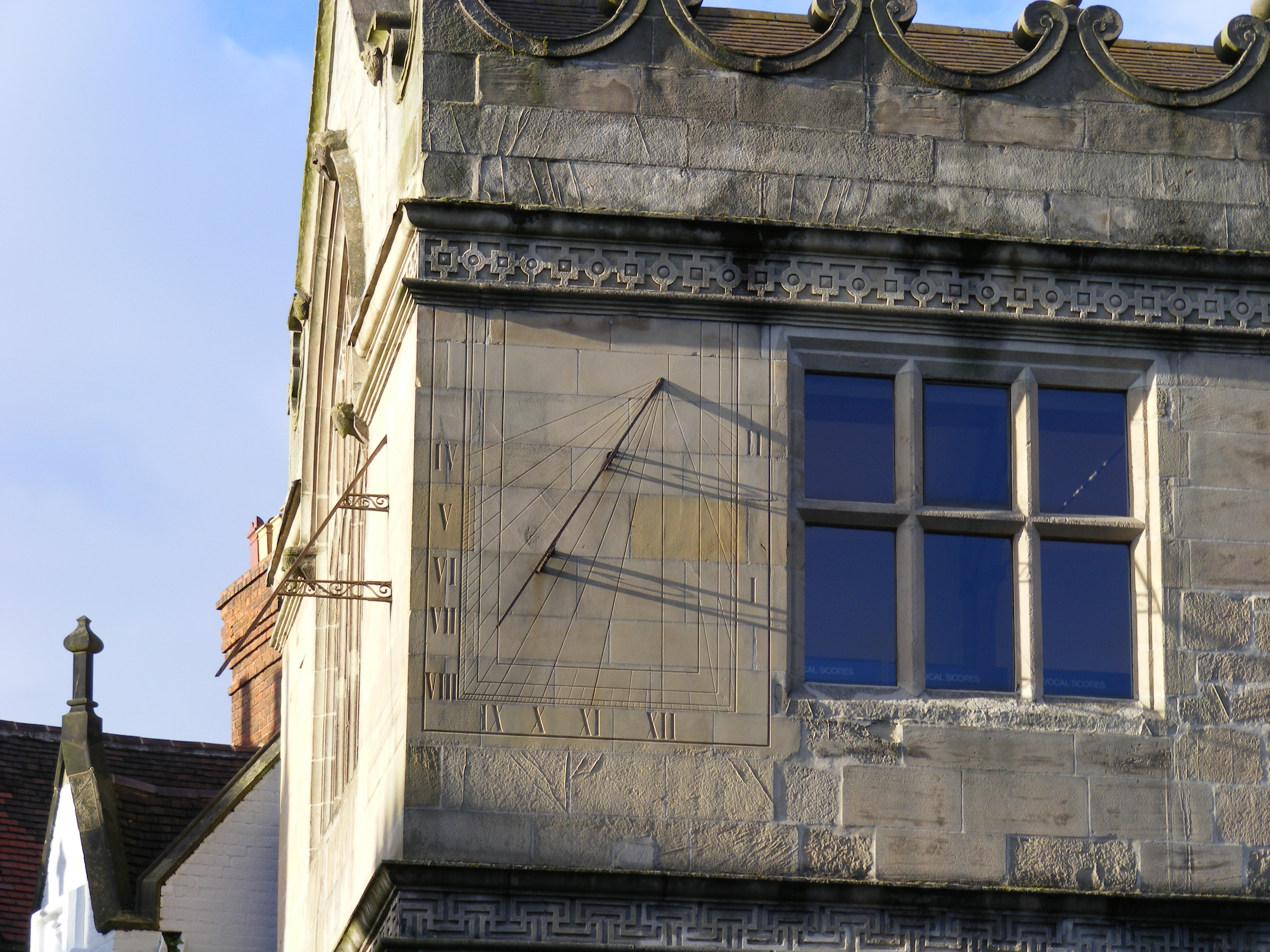
Sundials on south end (Old School Room)

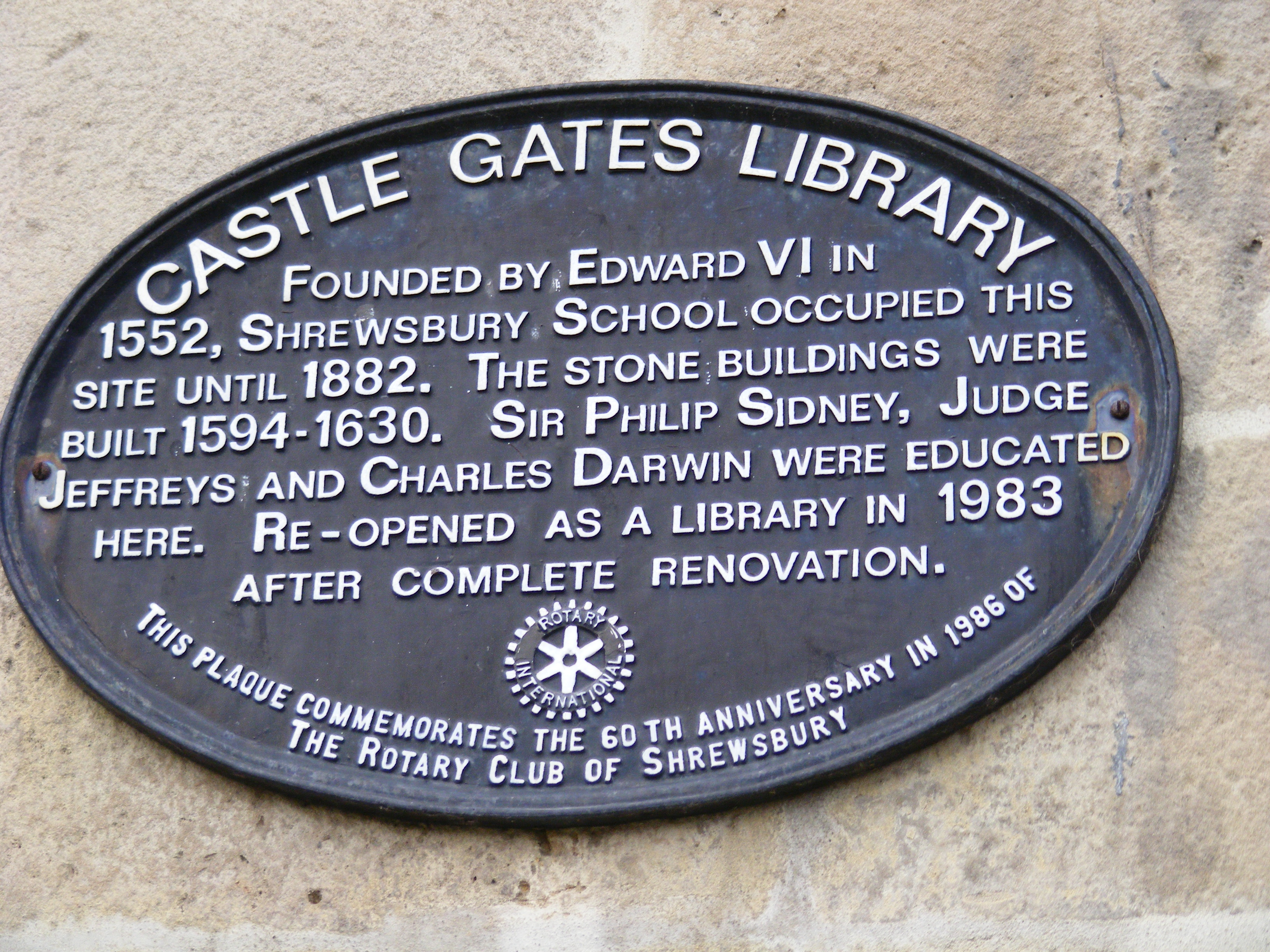
Information plaque

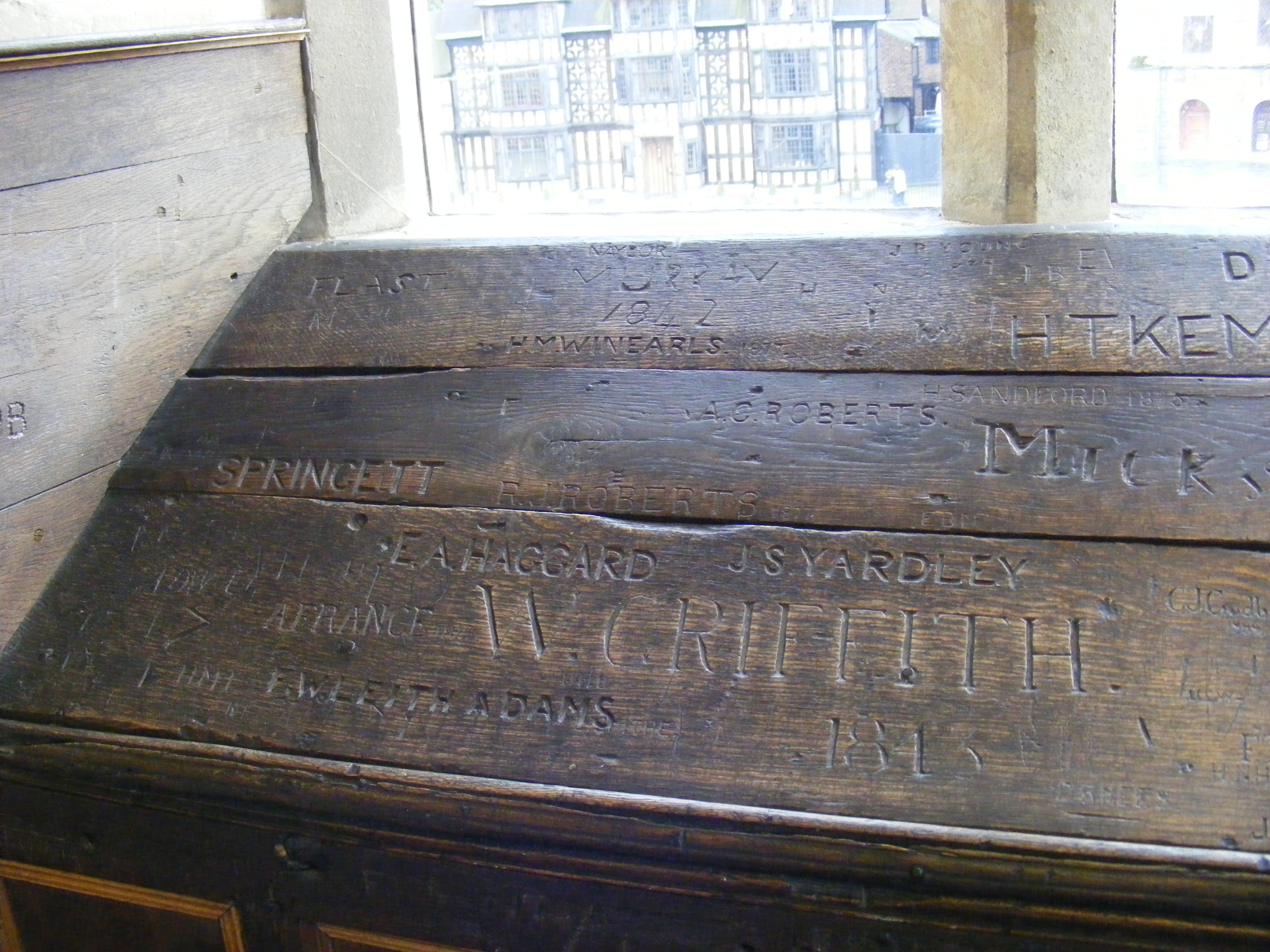
Pupils' names carved in window sill

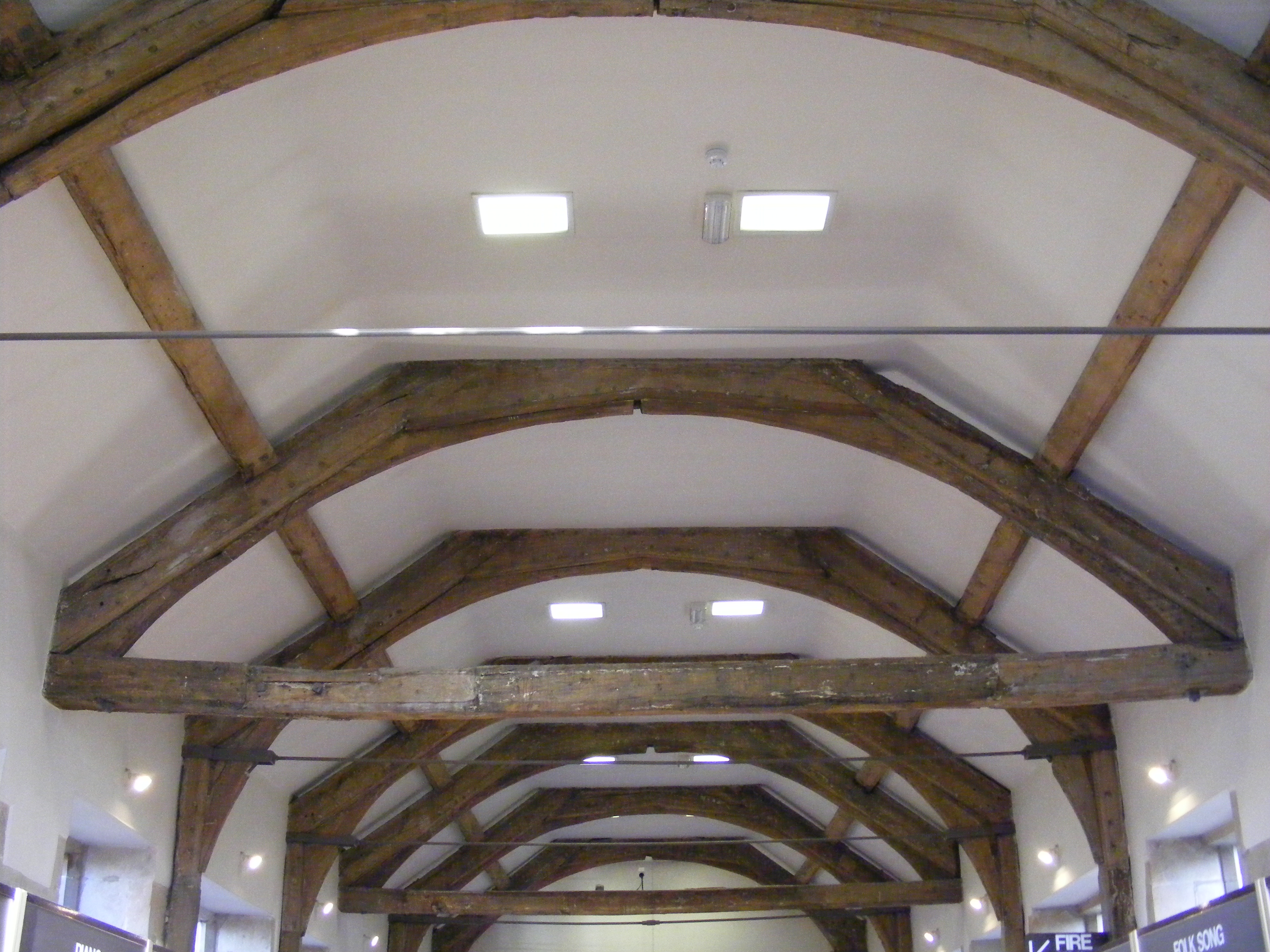
Old School Room ceiling

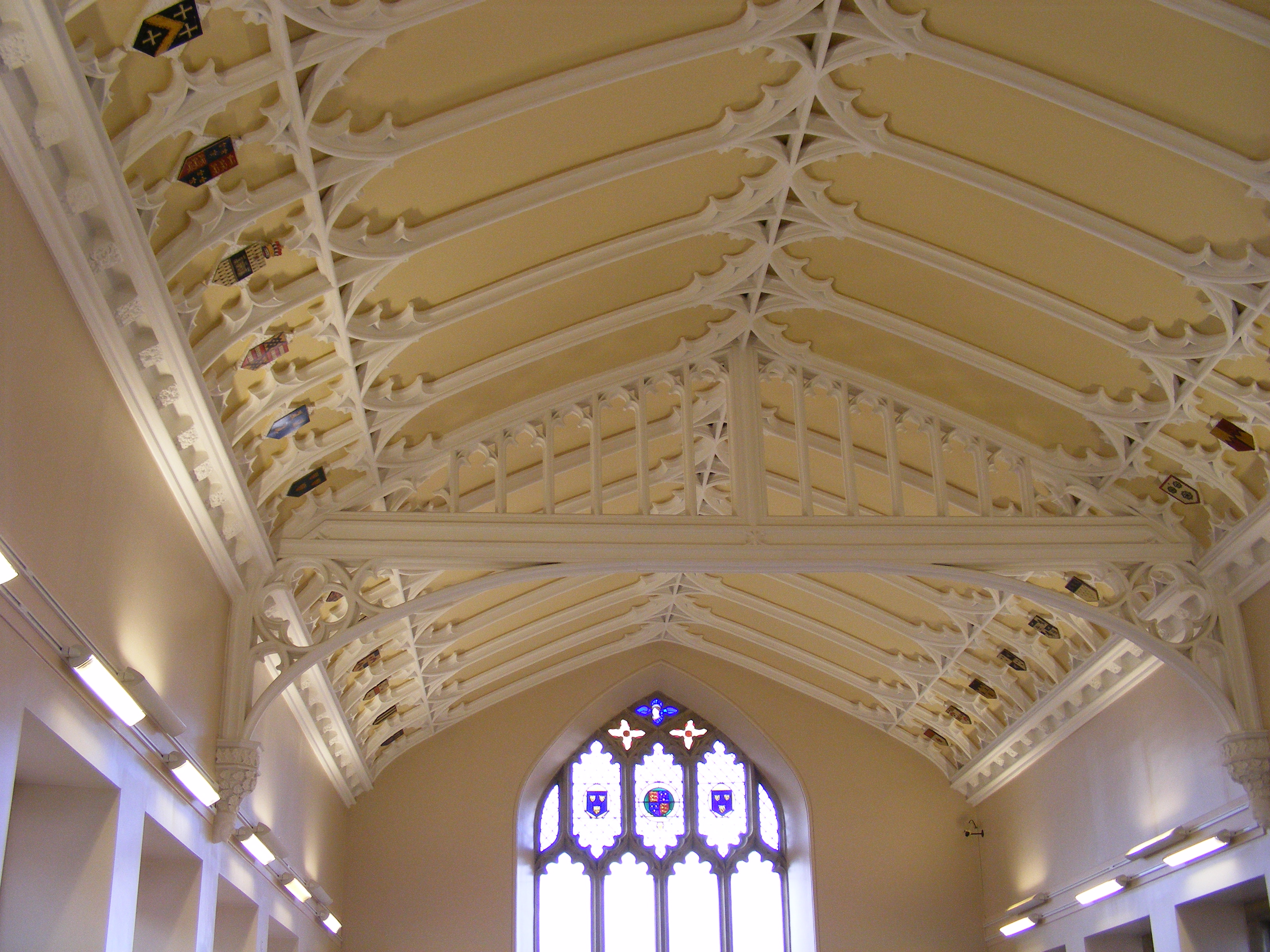
Darwin Room ceiling showing heraldic shields

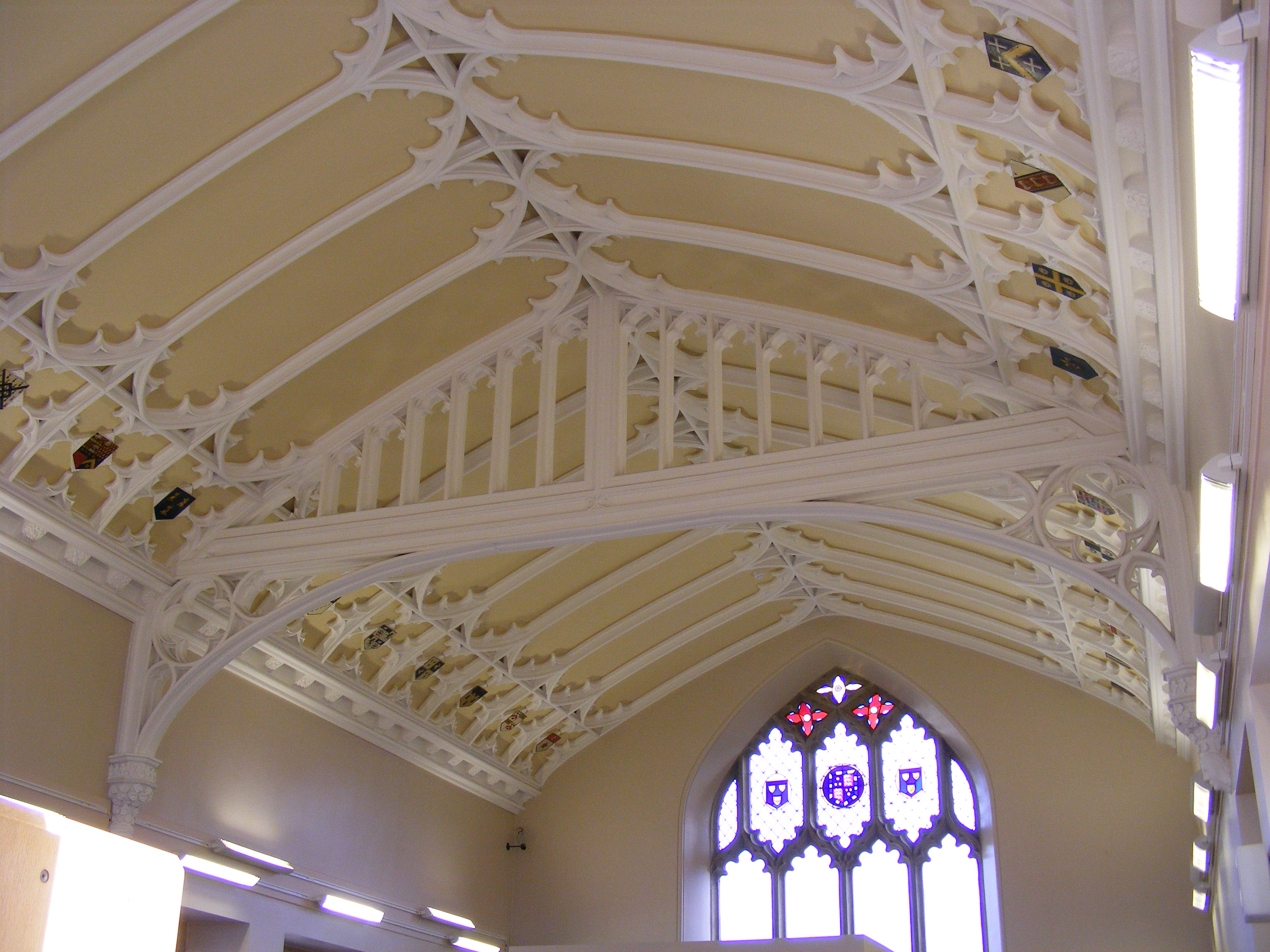
Darwin Room ceiling showing heraldic shields

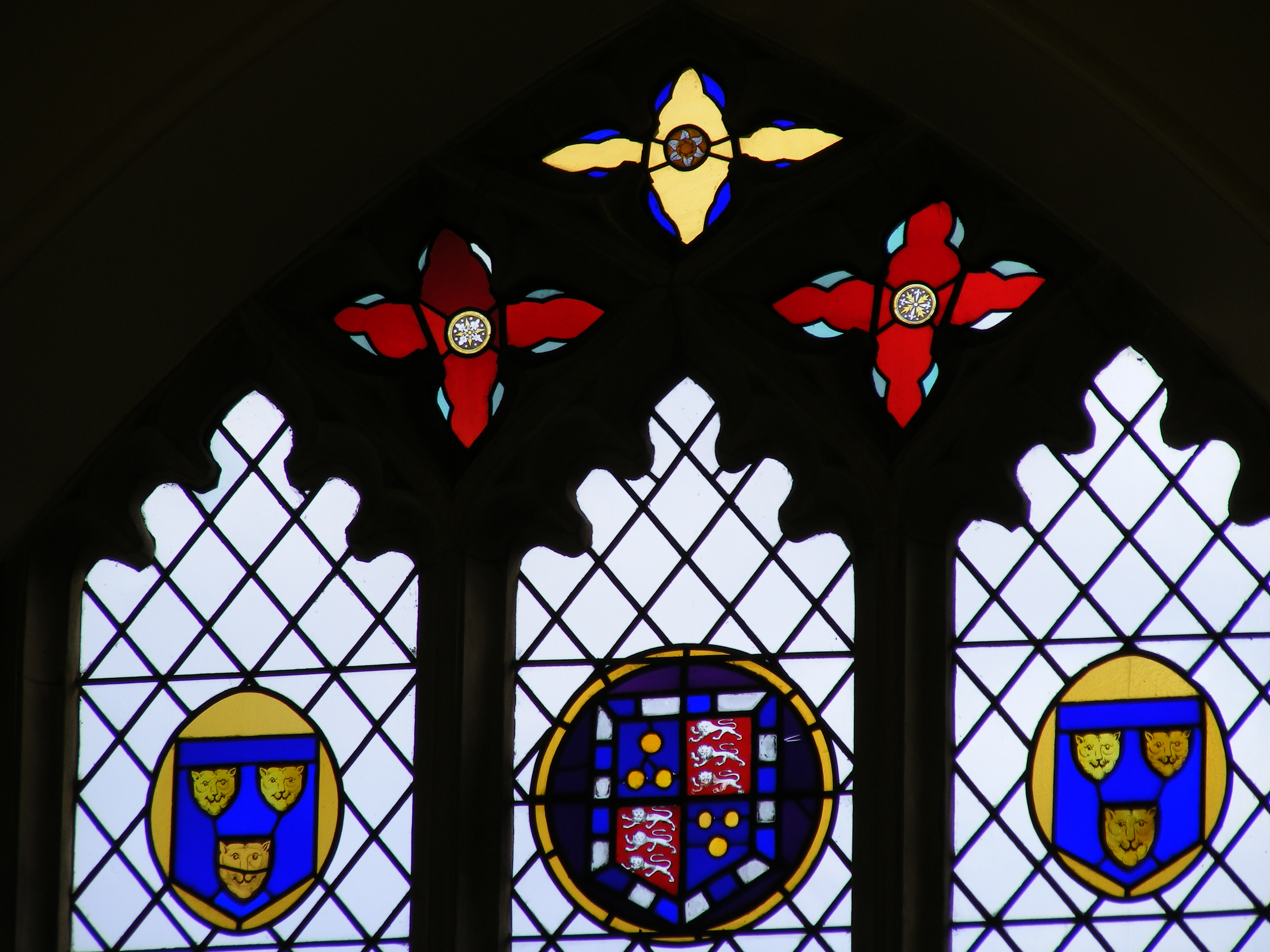
Stained glass window (castle end)

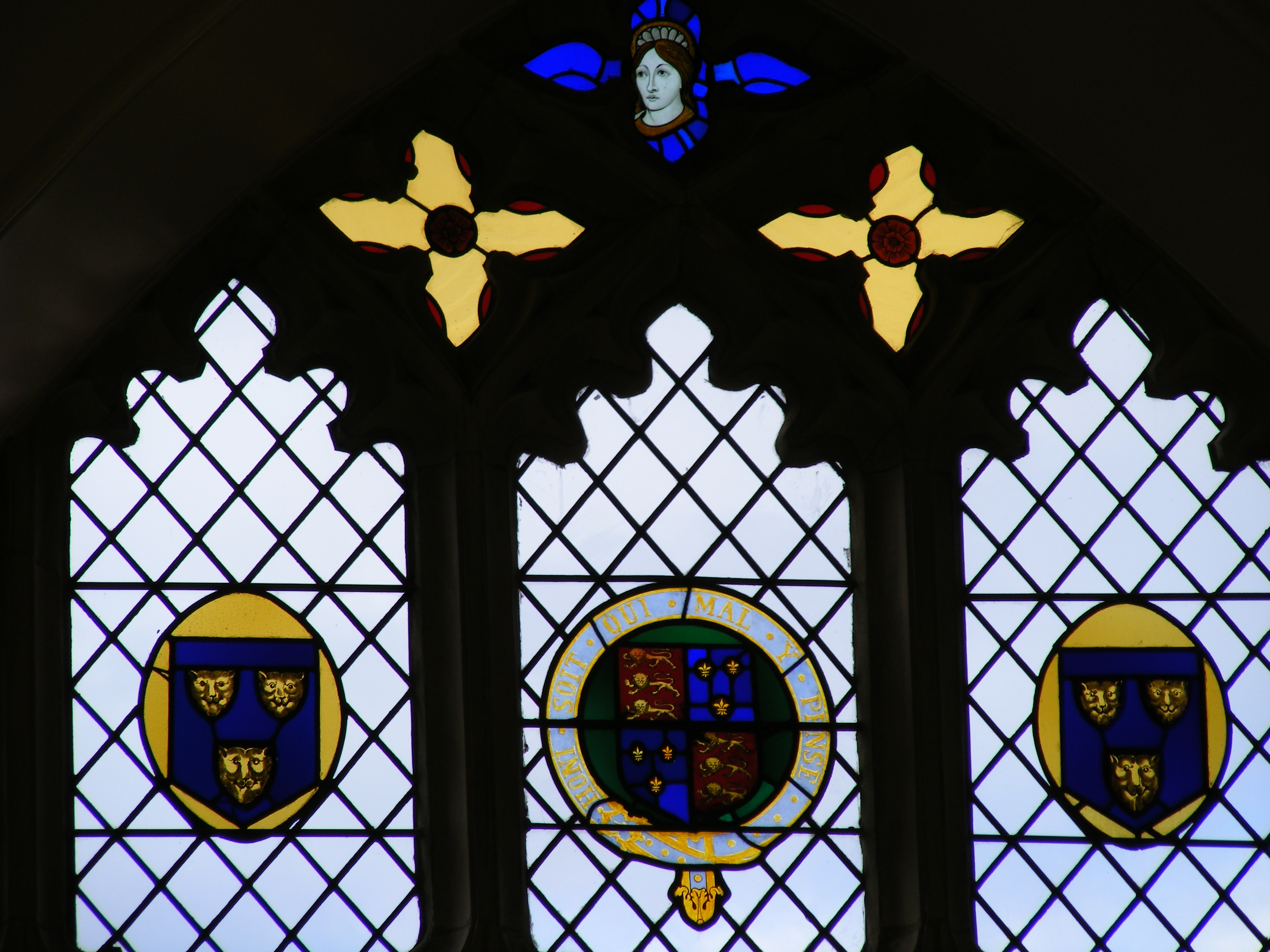
Stained glass window (other end)

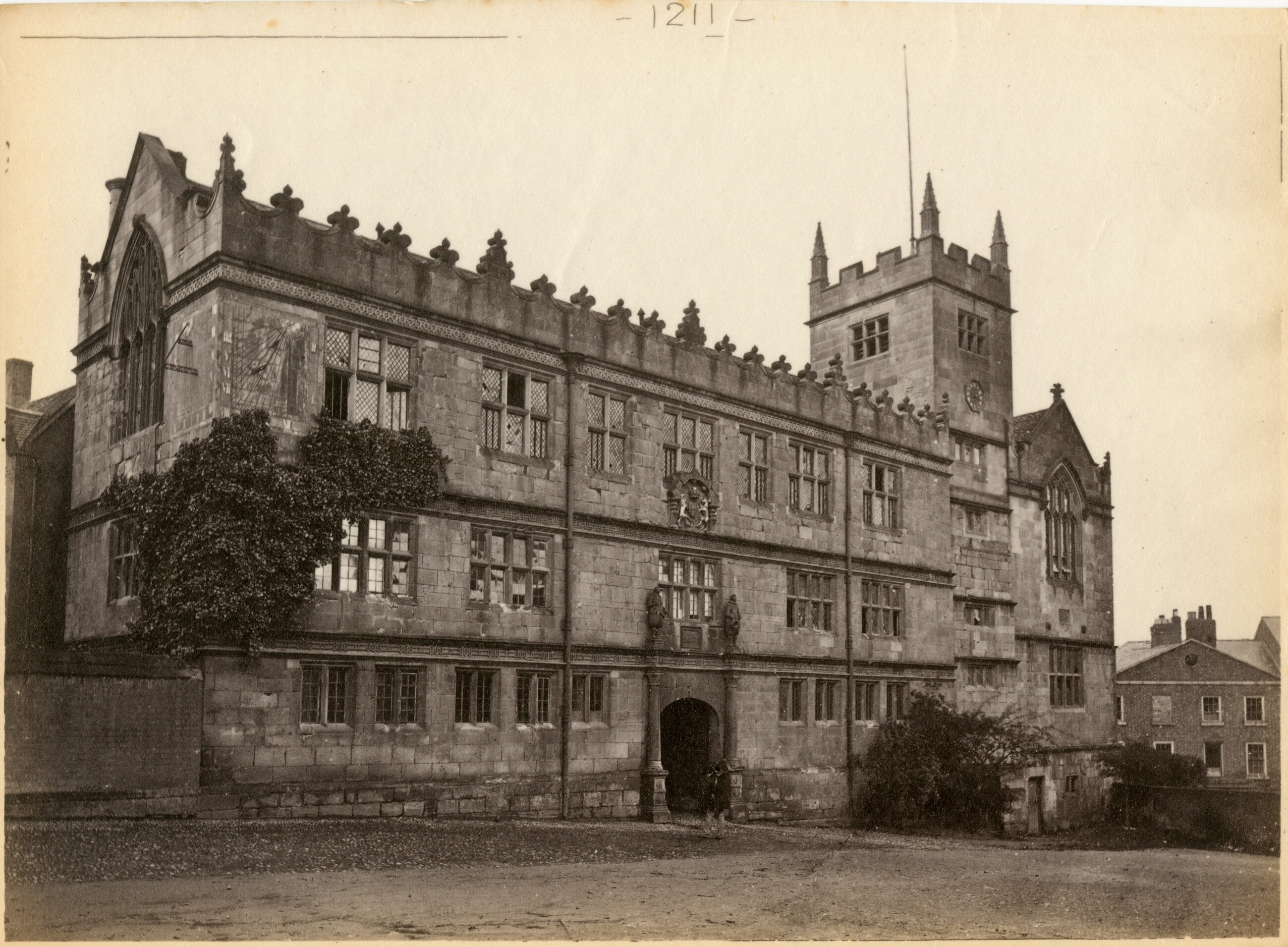
Shrewsbury Library by Francis Bedford, c. 1863-1884
