= Old Shirehall, Shrewsbury =

County building in Shrewsbury, Shropshire, England

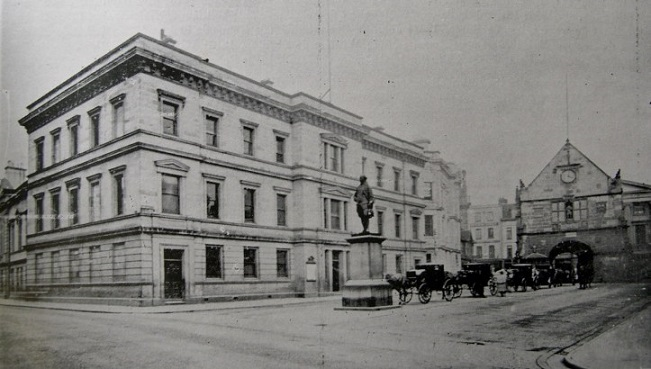
- Old Shirehall, Shrewsbury

- Shown in Shropshire
- 52.7075°N 2.7539°W
- Location: Shrewsbury

History
- Built: 1837
- Demolished: 1971

Site notes
- Architect: Sir Robert Smirke
- Architectural style: Italianate style

The Old Shirehall was a municipal facility in Market Square, Shrewsbury, Shropshire. It was demolished in 1971 to make way for a retail and commercial centre.

== History ==
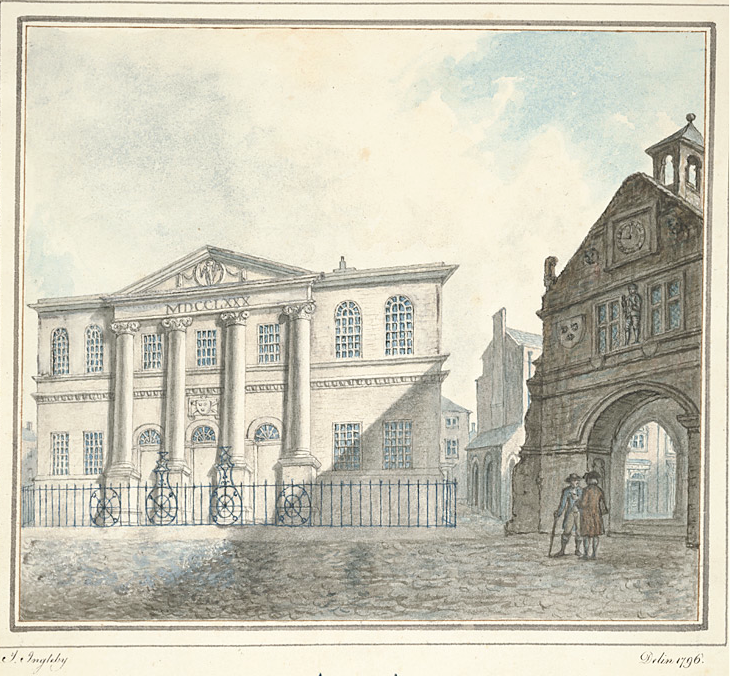
Haycock's town hall

Shrewsbury Guildhall Act 1783
- Act of Parliament
- Parliament of Great Britain
- Long title: An Act for building a new Shire Hall and Guildhall for the County of Salop and the Town of Shrewsbury in the said County; and for the other Purposes therein mentioned.
- Citation: 23 Geo. 3. c. 20
- Territorial extent: Great Britain

Dates
- Royal assent: 17 April 1783
- Commencement: 5 December 1782 (Note: Start of session.)
- Repealed: 9 June 1915
Other legislation
Repealed by	Salop County Council (Shirehall and Guildhall) Act 1915

Status: Repealed

Text of statute as originally enacted

The building was commissioned to replace an earlier shire hall on the site which had been designed by John Hiram Haycock in the neoclassical style and completed in 1785. After finding that the earlier building was suffering from fissures due to its inadequate foundations in the context of poor ground conditions, county leaders decided to procure a new building on the same site.

The new building, which was designed by Sir Robert Smirke, in the Italianate style and built by Birch and Sons at a cost of £12,000, was completed in March 1837. The design involved a symmetrical main frontage with nine bays facing onto Market Square; the central section, which slightly projected forward, featured a doorway on the ground floor and pedimented windows on the first and second floors. Internally, the principal rooms were the two courtrooms (one for the crown court and one for the nisi prius court); there was also a "Great Room", which measured 45.5 feet (13.9 m) long, 32.5 feet (9.9 m) wide and 19.0 feet (5.8 m) high, for public gatherings. The building was badly damaged in a fire, which was incompetently tackled by the local fire brigade, in November 1880 and was subsequently rebuilt internally.

The building continued to be used as a facility for dispensing justice but, following the implementation of the Local Government Act 1888, which established county councils in every county, it also became the meeting place of Salop County Council. The local borough guildhall (i.e. borough council meeting place) was incorporated into the shirehall under a long-standing arrangement which pre-dated Smirke's structure. Council meetings were held in one of the courtrooms. The borough council moved out to Newport House in Dogpole in 1917 leaving the county council on their own. After the county council moved to the new Shirehall in Abbey Foregate in 1966, the building remained vacant and deteriorating until it was demolished to make way for a new retail and commercial centre known as Princess House in 1971.

Works of art in the old Shirehall included a portrait of General Lord Hill by Sir William Beechey and a portrait of Admiral Sir Edward Owen by Richard Evans. Both these paintings were subsequently transferred to the Shrewsbury Museum and Art Gallery.
