= Belmont, Lyme Regis =

Country house in Dorset, England

Belmont
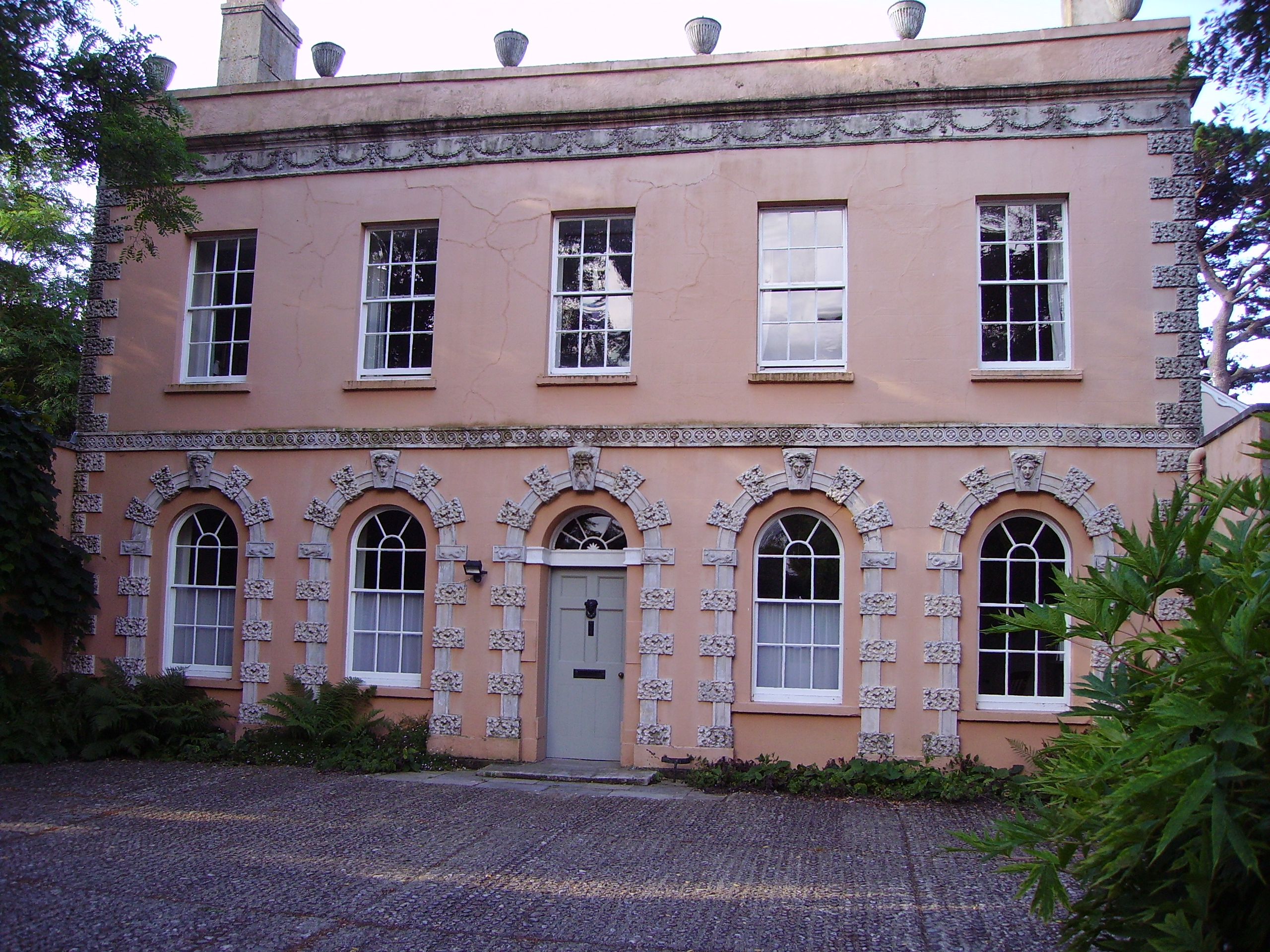
- Interactive map of the Belmont area

General information
- Coordinates: 50.72434°N 2.94006°W

Belmont is a Grade II* listed country house near Lyme Regis, South West England. In the early nineteenth century it was owned by the businesswoman Eleanor Coade, famed for supplying the artificial stone known as Coade stone. The picture of Belmont below shows the pediment and front of the house adorned by numerous Coade stone mouldings.

More recently the house was occupied for many years by the English novelist John Fowles, and is now owned by the Landmark Trust.
