= Shirehall, Shrewsbury =

County building in Shrewsbury, Shropshire, England

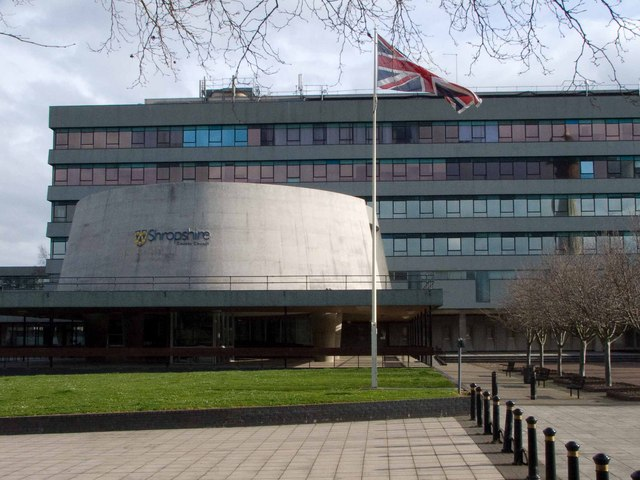
- Shirehall

- Location within Shropshire

General information
- Architectural style: Modernist style
- Location: Abbey Foregate, Shrewsbury, United Kingdom
- Coordinates: 52.7050°N 2.7315°W
- Completed: 1966

Design and construction
- Architect: Ralph Crowe

Shirehall is a municipal facility in Abbey Foregate, Shrewsbury, Shropshire. The building, which was the headquarters of Shropshire Council between 1966 and 2025, is north of Lord Hill's Column.

== History ==
The building was commissioned to replace the Old Shirehall in Market Square. After deciding in the Old Shirehall was inadequate for their needs, county leaders decided to procure a new building: the site they selected had previously been occupied by a country house known as "Nearwell".

Nearwell was commissioned by a local solicitor, William Wybergh How, in 1868; he had owned a farm on the site which was a childhood home of his son, Walsham How, who went on to be the first Bishop of Wakefield. Nearwell subsequently remained in the How family until the mid-1940s and then became a hostel for boys studying at Shrewsbury Technical College before being demolished in August 1963.

The foundation stone for the new building was laid by Sir Offley Wakeman, a former chairman of the county council, on 25 July 1964. It was designed by Ralph Crowe, the County Architect, in the Modernist style, built at a cost of £1.8 million and was completed in April 1966. It was officially opened by Queen Elizabeth II, accompanied by the Duke of Edinburgh, on 17 March 1967. The design for the six-storey building facing Abbey Foregate involved continuous bands of glazing with concrete panels above and below: it also included an unusual ovoid-shaped council chamber which jutted out to the south-west of the main building. Pevsner described the building as "the major monument to post-war modernism in the county".

A single storey extension, also designed by Crowe, was added to the Shirehall, to accommodate the assizes and the local quarter session hearings, shortly after it opened. Following the implementation of the Courts Act 1971, the former assizes courthouse became the venue for hearings of the newly designated Shrewsbury Crown Court. The magistrates' courts moved to a new courthouse in Preston Street in 1994.

Originally established as the headquarters of Shropshire County Council, the building became the offices of the new unitary authority, Shropshire Council in April 2009. A scheme to refurbish the building at a cost of £24 million was proposed in December 2018. However, in September 2020, the council indicated that it would rather sell the building and move to the town centre. Then in October 2020, following an application for a certificate of immunity from listing requested by the county council, English Heritage decided not to list County Hall as the building did not meet the criteria for listing post-1945 buildings. In May 2021 the Twentieth Century Society placed the site on its Top 10 Buildings at Risk List.

In February 2025, Shirehall was closed and the council relocated to the Guildhall in Frankwell. In November of that year, the planned demolition of the building and sale of the land was paused, with the council considering moving back into the building.

Works of art in the building include a cast iron mural by Rosalind Alexander, located in the entrance hall, depicting Shropshire industries.
