= Caroline Stanford =

British historian and author

- Born: Chipping Norton, England
- Education: Jesus College, Oxford; Birkbeck, University of London; Oxford Brookes University
- Occupations: Historian and author
- Organization: The Landmark Trust

Caroline Stanford is a British historian and author.

Stanford was educated at Jesus College, Oxford, Birkbeck, University of London and Oxford Brookes University, she has been historian at The Landmark Trust since 2001.

In 2013, she launched The Landmark Trust's 50 For Free scheme, which offers a number of free stays in Landmark Trust Properties to charities, educational schemes and carers.

== Selected publications ==
- Landmark: A History of Britain in 50 Buildings, with Anna Keay (2015, Frances Lincoln Publishers, ISBN 978-0711236455)
- Dearest Augustus and I: The Journal of Jane Pugin, Editor (2004, Spire Books Ltd, ISBN 978-0954361587)
- On Preserving Our Ruins (2000, Journal of Architectural Conservation)

== Filmography ==
- Time Team (2007)
- Walking Through History (2013)
