= Shropshire Council =

Unitary authority in England

- Coat of arms

- Council logo

Type
- Type: Unitary authority

History
- Founded: 1 April 1889

Leadership
- Chair: Duncan Borrowman, Liberal Democrats since 22 May 2025
- Leader: Heather Kidd, Liberal Democrats since 22 May 2025
- Chief Executive: Tanya Miles since September 2025

Structure
- Seats: 74 councillors
- Graph of the party split among 74 seats.
- Political groups: Administration (40) Liberal Democrats (40) Other parties (34) Reform (15) Conservative (7) Green (4) Labour (4) Independent (4)

Elections
- Voting system: First past the post
- Last election: 1 May 2025
- Next election: 3 May 2029

Motto
- Floreat Salopia (May Shropshire Flourish)

Meeting place
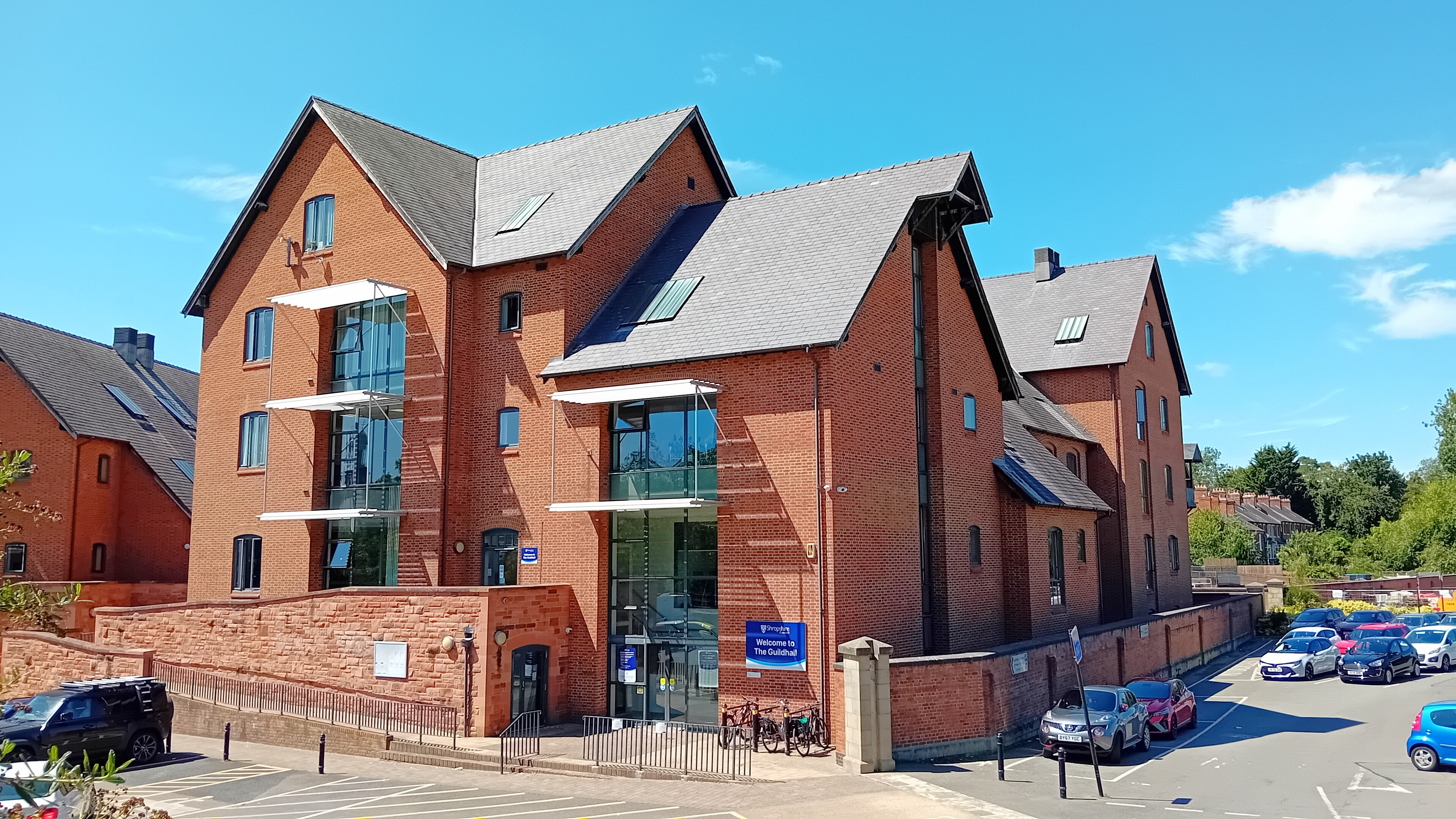
- The Guildhall, Frankwell Quay, Shrewsbury, SY3 8HQ

Website
- www.shropshire.gov.uk

Shropshire Council, known between 1980 and 2009 as Shropshire County Council and prior to 1980 as Salop County Council, is the local authority for the non-metropolitan county of Shropshire in the West Midlands region of England. Since 2009 it has been a unitary authority, being a county council which also performs the functions of a district council. The non-metropolitan county is smaller than the ceremonial county of Shropshire, which additionally includes Telford and Wrekin.

The council is based at the Guildhall in the Frankwell area of Shrewsbury. At the 2025 election, the Liberal Democrats took control of the council.

== History ==
Elected county councils were established in 1889 under the Local Government Act 1888, taking over administrative functions that had previously been performed by unelected magistrates at the quarter sessions. The first elections were held in January 1889 and the county council formally came into being on 1 April 1889. On that day it held its first official meeting at the Shirehall in Shrewsbury, the courthouse (built 1837) which had served as the meeting place for the quarter sessions. The first chairman was Alfred Salwey of Overton, who had also been chairman of the quarter sessions for some years prior to the creation of the county council.

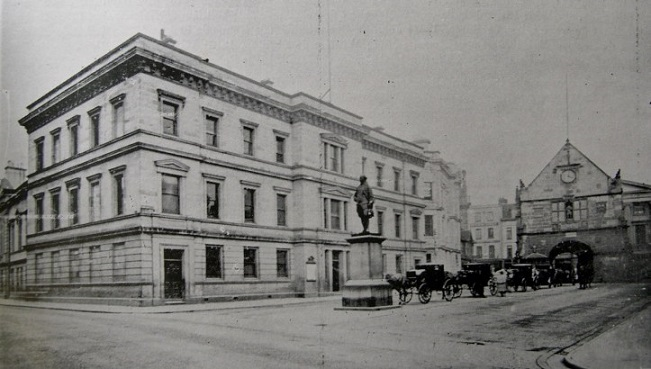
Old Shirehall, Shrewsbury: Shropshire County Council's headquarters 1889–1966

The Local Government Act 1888 which created county councils did not specify the names of the counties. As Shropshire was also known as Salop, the names 'Shropshire County Council' and 'Salop County Council' were used interchangeably in the council's early years. The council chose to adopt an official seal inscribed in Latin rather than English: Concilii comitatus Salopiensis sigilum commune. The county's legal name was confirmed as being Salop by the Local Government Act 1933.

Local government was reformed in 1974 under the Local Government Act 1972, which saw Salop designated as a non-metropolitan county. The lower tier of local government was reorganised as part of the same reforms. Prior to 1974 the lower tier had comprised numerous boroughs, urban districts and rural districts. They were replaced by six non-metropolitan districts: Bridgnorth, North Shropshire, Oswestry, Shrewsbury and Atcham, South Shropshire and The Wrekin. The county's legal name remained Salop, although two of the districts included 'Shropshire' in their names.

Logo used until 2009

The council changed the county's legal name from Salop to Shropshire with effect from 1 April 1980, after which the council was called Shropshire County Council.

In 1998, following the recommendations of the Local Government Commission, The Wrekin district was removed from the non-metropolitan county of Shropshire, with its council becoming a unitary authority, independent from the county council. The district council chose to rename the district 'Telford and Wrekin' at the same time.

In 2006 the government published a white paper which encouraged more unitary authorities to be established, particularly in counties with small populations. This started the process which culminated in the 2009 structural changes to local government in England.

Shropshire County Council, supported by South Shropshire District Council and Oswestry Borough Council, proposed to the government that the non-metropolitan county of Shropshire should become a single unitary authority. This was opposed by the other three districts in the county. Shrewsbury and Atcham Borough Council took legal action challenging the government's decision to proceed with the reorganisation, but was unsuccessful.

Comparison of districts within Shropshire, 1974-2009 (left), and from 2009 (right)
County council area Unitary

Shropshire County Council became a unitary authority with effect from 1 April 2009. The way the changes were implemented was that the five remaining districts in the non-metropolitan county were abolished and merged into a single district called Shropshire, but with there being no separate district council. Instead, the existing county council also took on the functions that legislation assigns to district councils. The county council was given the option of omitting the word 'county' from its name as part of the reforms, which it took, becoming 'Shropshire Council'.

== Governance ==
As a unitary authority, Shropshire Council provides both county-level and district-level functions. The whole county is also covered by civil parishes, which form a second tier of local government.

=== Political control ===
In 2025, the Liberal Democrats took control of the council. It had previously been under Conservative control since 2005.

Political control of the council since the 1974 reforms has been as follows:

Upper-tier county council

Party in control	Years
No overall control	1974–2005
Conservative	2005–2009

Unitary authority

Party in control	Years
Conservative	2009–2025
Liberal Democrats	2025–present

=== Leadership ===
The leaders of the council since 2001 have been:

Councillor	Party	From	To
Roger Walker	Labour	2001	2005
Malcolm Pate	Conservative	2005	18 Jun 2009
Keith Barrow	Conservative	18 Jun 2009	4 Dec 2015
Malcolm Pate	Conservative	17 Dec 2015	18 May 2017
Peter Nutting	Conservative	18 May 2017	May 2021
Lezley Picton	Conservative	20 May 2021	May 2025
Heather Kidd	Liberal Democrats	22 May 2025	

=== Composition ===
Following the 2025 election, and a subsequent changes of allegiance until July 2026, the composition of the council was:

Party	Councillors
Liberal Democrats	40
Reform	15
Conservative	7
Green	4
Labour	4
Independent	4
Total	74

One of the independents sits in a group with the Green Party. The next election is due in 2029.

== Elections ==
Since the last review of boundaries took effect in 2025, the council has comprised 74 councillors representing 72 electoral divisions. Most divisions elect one councillor, but the St Martin's and Wem divisions each elect two councillors. Elections are held every four years.

== Premises ==
In February 2025, the council relocated to the Guildhall in the Frankwell area of Shrewsbury. The Guildhall had been completed in 2004 as the headquarters for the old Shrewsbury and Atcham Borough Council.

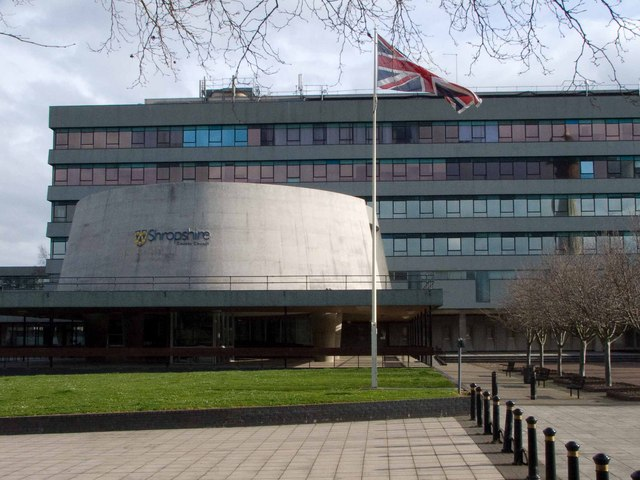
Shirehall, Abbey Foregate, Shrewsbury: Council's headquarters 1966–2025

The council was previously based at the Shirehall on Abbey Foregate in Shrewsbury, which was purpose-built for the council and opened in 1966. The council announced its intention to vacate Shirehall in 2024.

Prior to 1966 the council was based at the Old Shirehall in Shrewsbury, which was subsequently demolished.

== See also ==
- Parliamentary constituencies in Shropshire
- Flag of Shropshire
