= Listed buildings in Belper =

Belper is a civil parish in the Amber Valley district of Derbyshire, England. The parish contains over 250 listed buildings that are recorded in the National Heritage List for England. Of these, one is listed at Grade I, the highest of the three grades, 15 are at Grade II*, the middle grade, and the others are at Grade II, the lowest grade. The parish contains the town of Belper, the village of Milford, smaller settlements, including Makeney and Bargate, and the surrounding countryside. Industry has been a major feature in the town, initially with nail making, and some workshops have survived and are listed. Major industry arrived towards the end of the 18th century when Jedediah Strutt and Richard Arkwright built a textile mill in the town. Later, Arkwright moved away, and more mills were built by Strutt, and later by his sons. North Mill was built in 1804 by William Strutt, it was one of the first iron-framed and fireproof mills to be built, and is listed at Grade I. The Strutt family built housing for their workers in Belper and Milford, usually in the form of long terraces, many of which have survived and are listed. The family also built farms to produce food for the community, including Crossroads Farm, Dalley Farm, Wyver Farm, and Moscow Farm; the farmhouses and associated farm buildings are listed.

Between 1835 and 1840 the North Midland Railway built a line through the centre of the town which passed through a deep cutting. The series of bridges crossing the line in the town and to the south are listed. Also, to the south, the line passed through Milford Tunnel; the portals of the tunnel and a tower built during its construction are listed. The River Derwent passes through the parish, and the listed buildings associated with it are bridges, weirs and sluices. Within the town and villages, most of the listed buildings are houses, cottages and associated structures, shops, churches, chapels and associated items, public houses and hotels, industrial buildings, some of which have been converted for other uses, schools, and public buildings. The other listed buildings in the town and villages include almshouses, a former workhouse, later a hospital, cemetery buildings, a drinking fountain, a bandstand, war memorials, and telephone kiosks. Outside the urban areas, the listed buildings include farmhouses and farm buildings, a former toll house, a milestone, and a former firing range.

== Key ==
Grade	Criteria
I	Buildings of exceptional interest, sometimes considered to be internationally important
II*	Particularly important buildings of more than special interest
II	Buildings of national importance and special interest

== Buildings ==
Name and location	Photograph	Date	Notes	Grade
St John the Baptist's Church; 53.02396°N 1.47594°W		c. 1260	Originally a Foresters' Chapel, it has since been altered, it was restored in 1870, and has later been used as a heritage centre. It is in stone and has a tile roof with coped gables, and consists of a nave and a chancel in one unit, and a south porch. On the west gable is a bellcote, the windows are small lancets, and at the east and west ends are buttresses.	II
Wildersley Farmhouse; 53.01076°N 1.47450°W	—	Late 16th to early 17th century	The farmhouse is in sandstone, and has a tile roof with coped gables and kneelers. There are two storeys with attics, and five bays, two projecting with gables, the left one a porch, and in each gable is a small window. The doorway has a quoined surround and a large lintel, and the windows are mullioned with architraves and hood moulds.	II
Broadholm Farmhouse; 53.04015°N 1.48168°W	—	17th century	The farmhouse is in stone with a tile roof, two storeys and three bays. The doorway is in the centre, and the windows are mullioned. To the north is a lower two-storey single-bay extension with a gabled porch, and at the rear is a later red brick wing.	II
North wing, Dalley Farmhouse; 53.02915°N 1.49924°W	—	17th century	The wing is in stone with a slate roof, two storeys and two bays, and it contains sash windows. The rear extends into a later two-storey red brick range, with three bays and casement windows.	II*
Lodge Farmhouse; 53.03846°N 1.45587°W	—	17th century (probable)	The farmhouse is in stone with a tile roof. There are two storeys and four bays, the left bay projecting and gabled. The doorway in the second bay has a hood on brackets, in the third bay is a gabled dormer, and the other windows are casements.	II
Makeney Yard; 52.99666°N 1.47700°W	—	17th century	A row of four houses at right angles to the road, in sandstone, that have a tile roof and coped gables. There are two storeys and attics, most of the windows are mullioned, and contain casements, some with hood moulds.	II
Milford House Cottages; 53.00171°N 1.48081°W	—	17th century	A row of three stone cottages with a tile roof and two storeys, No. 1 has a moulded stone band carried up over the windows as a hood mould. Nos. 1 and 3 have plain window surrounds, and No. 3 has mullioned windows. The other windows are casements.	II
Redhill Farmhouse and Cottage; 52.99518°N 1.47596°W	—	17th century (probable)	The building has been altered and extended. It is in stone with a slate roof, two storeys and six bays, and partly with a double-pile plan. Some windows are sashes, others are casements, and the earlier ones are mullioned. The door has a quadripartite fanlight.	II
Chevin Mill and mill house 53.02596°N 1.49711°W		17th to 18th century	The mill and attached mill house are in stone and brick, party colourwashed, and they form an L-shaped plan. The roof is tiled, and on the mill roof is a louvred vent. The mill has an external staircase, and a doorway with a surround of massive quoins, and to the rear is a wheel pit. The house is to the east, and contains irregularly placed doors and windows.	II
Building south of Dalley House; 53.03900°N 1.50357°W	—	Late 17th to early 18th century	The building is in stone with a slate roof and a single storey. The windows are mullioned.	II
The Devonshire Inn; 53.02542°N 1.48527°W		Late 17th to early 18th century	The public house is in stone, with quoins, an eaves band, and a slate roof. There are two storeys and four bays. It contains a casement window in the upper floor, an inserted bow window in the ground floor, and most of the other windows are mullioned. On the front is a sign on a wrought iron bracket.	II
The George and Dragon Inn; 53.02670°N 1.48559°W		Late 17th to early 18th century	Originally a coaching inn, it is in stone with quoins, a coved eaves cornice, and a pantile roof. There are three storeys, and south and east fronts of three bays each. On the east front is a porch with Doric columns, a frieze carved with masks, and a cornice and blocking course. In the ground floor are shop windows, the upper floors contain sashes, and there is a sign with a wrought iron bracket. On the south front, the windows are mullioned.	II
The Holly Bush Inn; 52.99822°N 1.47710°W		Late 17th to early 18th century	The public house and adjoining house to the left are in stone with a slate roof. There are two storeys and five bays. On the front are two doorways, with steps leading up to the left doorway. The windows vary, and include mullioned windows, partly blocked, sashes, and iron-framed casements.	II
20 Kilbourne Road; 53.02713°N 1.46346°W	—	Early 18th century	A stone house that has a tile roof with coped gables. There are two storeys and attics, and three bays. Most windows are mullioned, and there is a small attic window.	II
Laund Farmhouse; 53.03662°N 1.46119°W		Early 18th century	The farmhouse is in stone, and has a tile roof with coped gables. There are two storeys and three bays, with irregularly spaced windows.	II
Manor Farmhouse; 53.02202°N 1.47828°W		Early 18th century	The former farmhouse is in stone with a tile roof. There are two storeys and an attic, a symmetrical front of three bays, and a two-storey rear wing. The central doorway has a flat hood on brackets, and the windows are mullioned with two lights, and contain casements.	II
Pottery Farmhouse; 53.02430°N 1.45868°W	—	Early 18th century	The farmhouse is in stone, and has a slate roof with coped gables and kneelers. There are two storeys and three bays. On the front is a doorway and casement windows.	II
The Old King's Head public house 53.02192°N 1.48058°W		Early 18th century (or earlier)	The original part is in stone, and later in the 18th century rear wings were added, one in stone, the other in red brick. The original part has two storeys, coped gables with kneelers, and four bays. The doorway has a quoined surround, and the windows are mullioned, with casements. In the rear wings are sash windows.	II
147 Over Lane; 53.02729°N 1.44837°W		18th century	A farmhouse at right angles to the road that was later extended to the west. It is in stone, the added bay is rendered, and the roof is slated and has coped gables. There are two storeys and four bays, and the windows are casements. Enclosing the garden is a coped stone wall, ramped up to the house.	II
24 Queen Street; 53.02213°N 1.47949°W		18th century (or earlier)	A stone cottage with a tile roof, two storeys and two bays. On the front are two doorways and two sliding casement windows in each floor.	II
Dalley House; 53.03914°N 1.50345°W		18th century	A stone farmhouse with a slate roof, two storeys and three bays. The central doorway has a semicircular hood on brackets, and above it is a round multi-paned window. The other windows are mullioned.	II
Garage and storage building 53.02700°N 1.48132°W		18th century	Originally a nailer's workshop, later used for other purposes, it is in stone with a pantile roof. There is a single storey, and doorways and windows on the sides.	II
South View; 53.01405°N 1.48902°W	—	18th century	A stone house with a tile roof, and its gable end facing the road. There are two storeys, a symmetrical front of two bays, a central doorway, and sash windows.	II
The Lawn; 53.02828°N 1.47087°W	—	18th century	A stone house, partly rendered, with a hipped slate roof, two storeys, and an L-shaped plan. The short range has two bays, a central doorway, casement windows, and an external stone staircase. The longer range has four bays, a doorway with a flat hood on brackets, a canted bay window, and sash windows.	II
The Talbot Hotel; 53.03056°N 1.48758°W		18th century	The hotel, which was later extended, is in stone and has a tile roof with coped gables and kneelers. There is an L-shaped plan, the western part with three storeys, three bays, a doorway with massive quoins and a lintel, and an external staircase. The eastern wing at right angles has the same height, with two storeys and attics, and contains sash windows with segmental heads. In the angle is a porch.	II
Beech Lawn; 53.02488°N 1.48050°W		c. 1760	A stone house with a hipped tile roof. There are three storeys and a symmetrical front of three bays. The central doorway has pilasters, a rectangular fanlight, and a cornice. The windows are sashes.	II
Milford Wier (north); 53.00495°N 1.48178°W		Before 1771	The retaining walls of the weir in the River Derwent are in stone, and have a concave curve upstream. Relating to the weir is a mill goit with sluice gates on each side of the river. The stone bases for a former footbridge are still present.	II
Long House; 53.01806°N 1.50165°W	—	1771	A row of cottages combined into one house, in stone with a slate roof. There are two storeys and four bays, and the windows are casements.	II
1–5 Chevin Alley, Milford; 53.00252°N 1.48005°W		Late 18th century	A terrace of five industrial houses sloping down a hill, in stone with a slate roof. There are three storeys, and each house has one bay. Most of the windows are sashes, and stone walls form the boundary.	II
Former well house 53.00313°N 1.48091°W	—	Late 18th century	The former well house is in stone, and it consists of a rectangular chamber, partly underground. Steps lead down from the entrance to the water source, and there are smaller steps along the side.	II
Turn Pike Cottage; 52.99774°N 1.46701°W		1776	The former toll house is in stone with a stone slate roof. There is a single storey and three bays. On the front is a gabled porch, and the windows are casements.	II
Milestone; 52.99813°N 1.47708°W	—	1779	The milestone is a plain stone standing in front of the Holly Bank Inn. It is engraved with the date and "DERBY COACH ROAD".	II
Unitarian Chapel and Chapel Cottage; 53.02669°N 1.48015°W		1788	The chapel is in stone with a hipped slate roof and two storeys. The front on Field Row contains a round-arched entrance with a keystone, and there is an external cantilevered staircase leading to a doorway with a quoined surround. On the Short Row front is a gabled porch and three round-headed windows. Inside there are box pews, under which is an arched catacomb.	II*
26–36 Short Rows; 53.02702°N 1.48074°W		1788 to early 1790s	A terrace of eleven industrial houses stepped up a hill in pairs, in red brick with slate roofs. There are two storeys and each house has one bay. Most of the windows are later replacements.	II
38–47 Short Rows; 53.02687°N 1.48061°W		1788 to early 1790s	A terrace of ten industrial houses stepped up a hill, in red brick with slate roofs. There are two storeys and each house has one bay. Most of the windows are later replacements, and some of the houses have gabled porches.	II
Brook Cottage; 53.02060°N 1.48352°W		c. 1790	A house that has been extended and remodelled, it is in painted gritstone and red brick, and has a Welsh slate roof with coped gables. There are two storeys and a T-shaped plan, with a front range of five bays, and a rear service wing. On the front is an open porch and sash windows, two windows in the upper floor in gabled dormers. At the rear is a canted bay window.	II
Milford Weirs (south); 53.00158°N 1.47887°W		Before 1792	The upstream is the older of the two weirs in the River Derwent, the downstream weir being added in the early 19th century. The upstream weir is pointed upstream in the centre, and the lower weir is semicircular with a stone fish ladder in the centre.	II
Milford Bridge; 53.00233°N 1.47843°W		1792	The bridge carries Derby Road (A6 road) over the River Derwent, and was widened in 1906. It is in stone, and consists of two segmental arches with rusticated cutwaters. The later parapet is cantilevered out.	II
1–28 Hopping Hill, Milford; 53.00542°N 1.47951°W		1792–97	A terrace of 28 industrial houses stepped up a hill, in stone with slate roofs. Nos. 1–6 have two storeys and attics, the others have three storeys, and each house has one bay. The doorways have cambered heads and voussoirs, most of the ground floor windows are sashes, and the upper floors contain casement windows. In front of the houses are steps and coped boundary walls.	II
29 and 30 Hopping Hill, Milford; 53.00596°N 1.48051°W	—	1792–97	A pair of angled industrial houses at the end of s terrace, in stone with a slate roof. There are three storeys, No. 29 had two bays, and No. 30 has one. The doorways have cambered heads and voussoirs. No. 29 has angled tripartite windows in the left bay and dormers, and the other windows are sashes. In front of the houses are coped boundary walls.	II
31–52 Hopping Hill, Milford; 53.00631°N 1.48121°W	—	1792–97	A terrace of 22 industrial houses stepped up a hill, in stone with slate roofs. There are three storeys and each house has one bay. The doorways have cambered heads and voussoirs. The windows are a mix of sashes and casements, some are later replacements, and some houses have dormers. In front of the houses are steps and coped boundary walls.	II
4–13 Crown Terrace; 53.02603°N 1.48481°W		1792–94	A terrace of ten industrial stone houses with a slate roof. There are three storeys, each house has one bay, and two-storey brick extensions were added in 1890. The doorways have cambered heads and voussoirs, and the windows have replacement glazing.	II
Storage facility and ice house 53.03099°N 1.49036°W	—	c. 1793	The facility was built for Bridge Hill House, since demolished, and consists of a covered storage ensemble incorporating an ice house and three parallel vaulted chambers. The chambers are in gritstone, and the ice house is in brick with a domed roof.	II
7–20 Long Row; 53.02739°N 1.48399°W		1794–97	A terrace of 14 industrial stone houses with a slate roof sloping up a hill. There are three storeys, and each house has one bay. The doorways have cambered heads and voussoirs, the windows have massive lintels, some windows are sashes, and others have replacement windows.	II
25–36 Long Row; 53.02739°N 1.48236°W		1794–97	A terrace of industrial stone houses with a slate roof. There are three storeys, and each house has one bay. The doorways have cambered heads, some windows are sashes, and others have replacement windows, including two houses with bow windows.	II
71–77 Long Row; 53.02724°N 1.48518°W		1794–97	A terrace of seven industrial stone houses with a slate roof sloping down a hill. There are three storeys, and each house has one bay. The doorways have cambered heads and voussoirs, and the windows are sashes.	II
Stone baulks, Long Row; 53.02732°N 1.48396°W	—	1794–97	The small stone baulks outside each house have a square plan, rounded corners and concave tops. The line of the baulks is maintained across the railway bridge by kerbs.	II
Road archway and offices 53.02856°N 1.48650°W		c. 1795	The archway was built as a footbridge over the road to connect mills, and the office building was added in the early 19th century. The archway is in stone with a slate roof and two storeys, and contains a central segmental arch for vehicles, and flanking round pedestrian arches. In the upper floor are five casement windows and gun embrasures, and in the western wall is a drinking fountain. The office building on the east has three storeys and a south front of five bays. It contains corner turrets, bands, a frieze, a cornice and blocking course, a parapet, and casement windows with mullions, those in the top floor larger, and with transoms.	II*
54 and 56 Belper Lane; 53.03365°N 1.48869°W	—	Mid 1790s	A pair of stone cottages with a tile roof, two storeys and two bays. No. 54 has a gabled porch, some windows are sashes, and others are later replacements.	II
58–62 Belper Lane; 53.03373°N 1.48878°W	—	Mid 1790s	A terrace of three stone houses with a tile roof. There are two storeys, and each house has one bay. Some windows are sashes, and others are later replacements.	II
64 and 66 Belper Lane; 53.03386°N 1.48891°W	—	Mid 1790s	A pair of stone houses with a tile roof. There are two storeys, and each house has one bay. Some windows are sashes, and others are later replacements.	II
86–92 Belper Lane; 53.03410°N 1.4891°W	—	Mid 1790s	Two buildings each with a pair of symmetrical houses, in stone with slate roofs. There are two storeys, and each house has two bays. In the centre of each house is a doorway, most windows are sashes, and some are later replacements.	II
Milford House; 53.00105°N 1.48174°W	—	1790s	A large house in stone with a slate roof. There are two storeys and a symmetrical eastern front with seven bays, the middle three bays projecting under a pediment. The central doorway has a round arch, pilasters, and an entablature, and the windows are sashes, those in the ground floor with jalousies.	II
Weirs, walls and sluices 53.02949°N 1.48629°W		1796–97	The main weir is concave, on a reef of gritstone, and associated with it are retaining walls and sluices. The sluices and floodgates have four segmental-headed arches, and there are more sluices under the adjacent mills. On the west side of the bridge is an additional weir.	II*
Belper Bridge; 53.02940°N 1.48726°W		1796–98	A road bridge carrying Bridge Foot (A517 road) over the River Derwent. It is in stone, and consists of three arches with rounded cutwaters. There are later pedestrian walkways cantilevered out with iron parapets.	II
Canteen, Milford Dyehouse; 53.00250°N 1.47979°W	—	c.1800	The former canteen is in stone with a slate roof. There are two storeys, and fronts of one and three bays. On the front is a blocked doorway, and windows with replacement glazing.	II
Former target wall and firing butts 53.00923°N 1.49283°W		c.1800	At the end of the firing range is a tall tapering target wall in gritstone with flat coping about 25 metres (82 ft) long, and 5 metres (16 ft) high. Along the range are five stone firing butts.	II
Coal Shute, Milford; 53.00559°N 1.47878°W	—	1800–09	The coal shute adjacent to West Terrace is paved and embanked. The brackets for an iron chain remain, but the opening is infilled with stone.	II
20, 22 and 24 Derby Road; 53.01346°N 1.48214°W		c. 1800	A group of stone houses, the middle house originally a toll house, with a tile roof. There are two storeys and attics, the middle house projecting under a gable. The windows are sashes or later replacements.	II
15 Belper Lane; 53.03140°N 1.48730°W	—	Late 18th to early 19th century	A stone house with two storeys and four bays. In the south front are two doorways and sash windows, and in the rear facing the road are small windows. There is a stone wall enclosing the garden and bordering the path.	II
23 Belper Lane; 53.03210°N 1.48698°W	—	Late 18th to early 19th century	The northern part of a block of houses, it is in stone with moulded eaves. There are two storeys, and an irregular front containing sash windows, and a shop front with pilasters and a cornice.	II
38 and 40 Belper Lane; 53.03296°N 1.48796°W	—	Late 18th to early 19th century	A house with its gable end to the street, it has been divided, and is in red brick with a tile roof. There are three storeys and two bays. On the front are two doorways and sash windows.	II
11–17 Bridge Street; 53.02336°N 1.48476°W		Late 18th to early 19th century	A row of four stone cottages with tile roofs, later shops. There are two storeys and each shop has one bay. In the ground floor are doorways, No. 11 has a shop front with a cornice on decorative consoles, the others have shop windows, and between Nos. 11 and 13 is a former passage entry. The upper floor contains horizontally-sliding sash windows.	II
21 Bridge Street; 53.02354°N 1.48482°W		Late 18th to early 19th century	A house on a corner site, later shops, with quoins and a hipped roof. There are three storeys and two bays. In the right bay is a shop front, and the left bay contains a former carriage arch with impost blocks and a keystone, and an inserted shop front. In the upper floors are sash and casement windows.	II
61 Bridge Street; 53.02519°N 1.48522°W		Late 18th to early 19th century	A stone house with a tile roof and coped gables. There are two storeys and two bays. The doorway in the right bay has a fanlight, and the windows are sashes. To the left is a garden wall containing a segmental carriage archway with impost blocks and a keystone, infilled and containing a doorway.	II
Rear building, 67 Bridge Street; 53.02526°N 1.48562°W	—	Late 18th to early 19th century	A small stone building, the gable end facing the street. It contains one casement window.	II
98–106 Bridge Street; 53.02650°N 1.48473°W		Late 18th to early 19th century	A terrace of red brick houses with a slate roof at right angles to the road. There are two storeys and each house has one bay. The windows, which are casements, and the doorways have cambered heads. On No. 98 is an inscribed metal plate.	II
121–125 Bridge Street; 53.02688°N 1.48566°W	—	Late 18th to early 19th century	A terrace of stone houses with slate roofs, two storeys and five bays. In the ground floor are two shop windows with cornices on consoles, and to the left is a segmental carriage arch with impost bands and a keystone. Most of the windows are sashes, and the others are later replacements.	II
Three iron posts, Chevin Alley, Milford; 53.00255°N 1.48023°W	—	Late 18th to early 19th century	At the top of the steps at the west end leading to the footpath in front of Chevin Alley are three tapering iron posts with rounded tops.	II
13, 15 and 17 Chevin Road, Milford; 53.00302°N 1.48043°W	—	Late 18th to early 19th century	A group of three industrial houses in gritstone that have tile roofs with coped gables and kneelers. Nos. 15 and 17 face the road, and are linked at right angles at the rear to No. 13 by a two-storey section containing a segmental carriage arch. The windows are a mix of sashes and casements.	II
17 Green Lane; 53.02498°N 1.48042°W		Late 18th to early 19th century	A stone house at right angles to the road, with a hipped roof. There are two storeys and four bays. In the front is a doorway, and most of the windows are sashes.	II
57–64 Hopping Hill, Milford; 53.00497°N 1.47927°W		Late 18th to early 19th century	A terrace of eight industrial houses in stone with pantile roofs. Most houses have two storeys, No. 58 has three, and each house has one bay. The doorways have cambered heads and voussoirs. Most of the windows are sashes with cambered heads, some are later replacements, and Nos. 61–64 have dormers.	II
40–53 Long Row; 53.02721°N 1.48235°W	—	Late 18th to early 19th century	Pairs of industrial houses stepped down a hill, in red brick, Nos.51–53 roughcast, with slate roofs. There are two storeys, and each house has two bays. Most of the doorways have cambered heads, and most of the windows are sashes. In front of the gardens are stone walls about 3 feet (0.91 m) high, with pitched coping.	II
58–63 Long Row; 53.02724°N 1.48366°W		Late 18th to early 19th century	Pairs of industrial houses stepped down a hill, in red brick with slate roofs. There are two storeys, and each house has two bays. Most of the doorways have cambered heads, and most of the windows are sashes. In front of the gardens are stone walls 3 feet (0.91 m) high, with pitched coping.	II
64–67 Long Row; 53.027°N 1.48408°W	—	Late 18th to early 19th century	A row of four industrial houses individually stepped down a hill, in stone with slate roofs. There are two storeys, No. 64 has one bay, and the others have two bays each. The doorways have cambered heads, most of the windows are sashes, and others are later replacements. In front of the gardens are stone walls about 3 feet (0.91 m) high, with pitched coping.	II
68–70 Long Row; 53.02717°N 1.48434°W	—	Late 18th to early 19th century	A row of three industrial houses at right angles to Long Row. They are in stone with slate roofs, and two storeys. Nos. 68 and 70 have three bays, No. 69 has one, the right bay is recessed, and on the left is an outshut. Most of the windows are sashes, and the others are later replacements.	II
Wall on bridge, Long Row; 53.02727°N 1.48316°W	—	Late 18th to early 19th century	The wall in front of the parapet of the bridge is in stone with pitched coping. It is about 3 feet (0.91 m) high, and in line with the garden walls on the south side of Long Row.	II
Wall to north and west of 68–70 Long Row; 53.02724°N 1.48470°W	—	Late 18th to early 19th century	The wall is in stone and is coped and ramped.	II
16–20 Market Place; 53.02381°N 1.47853°W	—	Late 18th to early 19th century	A row of four shops in stone, with roofs of slate and tile. There are two storeys and seven bays. In the ground floor are doorways with rectangular fanlights, and shop fronts dating from the early to mid 19th century, with pilasters and cornices, two also with decorative consoles. The upper floor contains sash windows.	II
36 Market Place; 53.02302°N 1.47911°W		Late 18th to early 19th century	A house at the end of a terrace in stone with some red brick. There are three storeys and one bay. In the ground floor is a shop window with an entablature, a cornice on scrolled brackets, a frieze, an architrave, and pilasters. The middle floor contains a sash window, and in the top floor is a casement window.	II
37–40 Market Place; 53.02293°N 1.47921°W		Late 18th to early 19th century	A row of four shops and houses stepped down a hill, in stone with tile roofs and three storeys. The outer buildings have two bays, and those in the centre have one each. Nos. 38 and 40 have shop fronts with a cornice, a frieze, an architrave, and pilasters. The doorway of No. 37 has a rectangular fanlight, and the windows are sashes.	II
Gate piers, gate and wall at 112 and 114 Marsh Lane; 53.02821°N 1.47122°W	—	Late 18th to early 19th century	There are two pairs of gate piers, one with pyramidal caps, the other with cushion caps. The gate is in iron, and there are quadrant walls, and a coped garden wall ramped up at the side of the lane.	II
2–16 and 20 Mill Street; 53.02716°N 1.48086°W		Late 18th to early 19th century	A terrace of nine red brick houses, stepped up a hill, with slate roofs, rendered on the gable end. There are two storeys, No. 2 has two bays, and the other houses have one bay each. The doorways have cambered heads, No. 2 has two shop windows, and the other windows are casements.	II
4 Sunny Hill, Milford; 53.00235°N 1.48147°W		Late 18th to early 19th century	A stone house with a tile roof, three storeys, and a symmetrical front of three bays. In the centre is a projecting porch, and on the front of the house are various iron fittings. The windows are casements with central opening lights.	II
7 and 9 Sunny Hill, Milford; 53.00195°N 1.48159°W	—	Late 18th to early 19th century	A pair of stone cottages with tile roofs, No. 9 with a higher ridge. There are two storeys and each cottage has two bays. No. 7 has sash windows with later glazing, and the windows in No. 9 are casements with central opening lights.	II
47 Sunny Hill, Milford; 53.00184°N 1.48472°W	—	Late 18th to early 19th century	A stone house at right angles to the road, with a tile roof. There are two storeys, a double pile plan, and a symmetrical front of two bays. The central door and the windows have stone lintels, and the windows are casements with central opening lights. The garden is enclosed by a high coped wall.	II
5–8 The Scotches; 53.03261°N 1.48633°W	—	Late 18th to early 19th century	A terrace of four industrial houses in stone with a tile roof. There are three storeys, and each house has one bay. The windows are a mix of sashes and casements, with some later replacements.	II
8–14 Well Lane, Milford; 53.00284°N 1.48100°W		Late 18th to early 19th century	A terrace of seven stone houses with a hipped slate roof. There are two storeys, and each house has two bays. The windows are a mix of sashes and casements. On the eastern side is a garden wall with a recess for a pump.	II
Cottages, Derby Road, Milford; 53.00259°N 1.47760°W	—	Late 18th to early 19th century	A pair of cottages with an outshut to the right. They are in stone with a tile roof, two storeys and one bay each. The doorways are in the centre, the windows are sashes, and in the outshut is a shop window.	II
Bankfield House; 53.02098°N 1.49555°W	—	Late 18th to early 19th century	A house with its gable end facing the road, it is in stone with a tile roof. There are two storeys and three bays, and the windows are sashes.	II
Bridge Farmhouse; 53.03064°N 1.48732°W	—	Late 18th to early 19th century	A stuccoed house with quoins and a slate roof. There are three storeys and cellars, two bays, and an angled single-storey wing on the left. The central porch has a quoined surround, voussoirs, and a cornice, and the doorway has a rectangular fanlight. The windows are sashes with lintels grooved to resemble voussoirs.	II
Bridge House; 53.00280°N 1.47783°W	—	Late 18th to early 19th century	A stone house with a tile roof, three storeys, three bays, and a single-storey outshut on the left. In the ground floor are casement windows and a bow window on the left, and the upper floors contain sash windows. In the outshut is a doorway and a large window.	II
Chevin Farmhouse; 53.01559°N 1.49062°W	—	Late 18th to early 19th century	The farmhouse is in stone with a tile roof, two storeys and two bays. In the centre is a gabled porch, and the windows have later glazing.	II
Cloister; 53.00264°N 1.48017°W	—	Late 18th to early 19th century	The house forms the rear wing at the end of a terrace. It is in stone and has a slate roof, sloping on the right. There are three storeys and three bays. The doorway has a cambered head, and the windows, which are irregularly placed, have modern glazing.	II
Duke's Buildings; 53.00521°N 1.47979°W	—	Late 18th to early 19th century	A terrace of eight industrial houses in stone with a pantile roof. There are three storeys, most houses have a single bay, and No. 2 has three bays. Most of the windows are sashes, and some have later glazing. A coping stone garden wall runs along the street.	II
Milford School; 53.00288°N 1.48007°W		Late 18th to early 19th century	The school is in stone and has a slate roof with cowl ventilators. There is a single storey facing the street, and two storeys at the rear, the lower storey arcaded. The front is symmetrical with twelve bays, and angled at the centre, where there is a porch and a doorway with a fanlight. The windows are paired sashes with small panes and cast iron glazing bars.	II
Milford View; 53.00347°N 1.48044°W	—	Late 18th to early 19th century	A pair of stone cottages with slate roofs, the rear facing the road. There are two storeys and attics, and each cottage has a front of three bays, the central bay with a pediment. The windows are sashes, and in the tympani of the pediments are roundels. The windows at the rear are irregularly placed, and one door has a fanlight.	II
Sunny Bank House; 53.01841°N 1.48111°W		Late 18th to early 19th century	A stone house at right angles to the road, with a tile roof, two storeys and three bays. The central doorway has pilasters and a cornice, it is flanked by narrow arched windows and bay windows containing sashes, and the windows in the upper floor are casements.	II
Walls, railings, gate, and monuments, Unitarian Chapel; 53.02648°N 1.48005°W		Late 18th to early 19th century	The grounds of the chapel are enclosed by stone walls, the front wall with railings and an iron gate. Inside the graveyard are monuments, flagstone paving and a kerbed path.	II
Walls, steps, and iron posts, Milford; 53.00486°N 1.47815°W		Late 18th to early 19th century	The footpath and steps between terraces is enclosed by stone walls. At the top and bottom are pairs of iron posts.	II
White Hart Public House; 53.01261°N 1.46263°W	—	Late 18th to early 19th century	The public house is in stone with a pantile roof. There are two storeys and four bays. The doorway has a rectangular fanlight, and most of the windows are casements.	II
Zion Methodist Church; 53.01556°N 1.48085°W		Late 18th to early 19th century	The chapel is in stone on a plinth, and has two storeys and a front with a pedimented gable and an inscribed plaque in the tympanum. In the centre is a doorway with a rectangular fanlight and a lintel, and the windows are sashes.	II
Former hosiery warehouse 53.02042°N 1.48416°W		Between 1802 and 1834	The former warehouse is in stone, with sill bands, an eaves band and blocking course, and pedimented gable ends with moulded cornices. There are three storeys and 21 bays, the middle five bays slightly projecting. In the centre is a pedimented porch, and the windows are sashes.	II
25–26 and 31–38 George Street; 53.02635°N 1.48248°W	—	After 1803	A cluster house consisting of four back to back houses, in stone with a slate roof. There are two storeys and two bays, and lean-to two-storey one-bay wings. The windows are sashes with stone lintels, the doorways have cambered heads and voussoirs, and there are stone garden walls.	II
1–8 Joseph Street; 53.02631°N 1.48325°W		After 1803	A cluster house consisting of four back to back houses, in stone with a slate roof. There are two storeys and two bays, and lean-to two-storey one-bay wings. The windows are sashes with stone lintels, the doorways have cambered heads and voussoirs, and there are stone garden walls.	II
3 and 4 William Street; 53.02668°N 1.48175°W	—	After 1803	A cluster house consisting of four back to back houses, in stone with a slate roof. There are two storeys and two bays, and lean-to two-storey one-bay wings. The windows are sashes with stone lintels, the doorways have cambered heads and voussoirs, and there are stone garden walls.	II
North Mill; 53.02895°N 1.48638°W		1804	One of the earliest iron-framed and fireproof mills in the world, it was designed by William Strutt. The lower parts of the exterior are in stone, the upper parts are in red brick, and the roof is slated with coped gables. There are five storeys, a T-shaped plan and fronts of 17 and six bays. The windows have cambered heads, in the west gable is a lunette, and the short range contains a wheel pit.	I
Moscow Farmhouse; 52.99651°N 1.48479°W	—	c. 1812–15	The farmhouse on a model farm is in stone with gabled slate roofs. There are two storeys and an irregular plan. The stone porch is in an angle, and the windows are sashes.	II*
Pottery Methodist Church and schoolroom 53.02708°N 1.46310°W		1816	The church is in stone, with two storeys, and a front of two bays with a shaped gable. On the front is a gabled porch, above which is a plaque and two windows. The schoolroom of 1878 to the right is in stone at the front and in red brick on the sides and rear. This has two storeys and two bays, and a gable with kneelers containing an oeil-de-boeuf. On the front is a porch, and the windows are sashes.	II
East and West Terraces, Milford; 53.00526°N 1.47830°W		1816–19	A terrace of back to back houses on a hillside, in stone with slate roofs. East Terrace has three storeys, West Terrace has two, and each house has one bay. Some windows are sashes, some are casements, and others are later replacements. There are stone walls along the footpaths, and along the gardens.	II
Former Baptist Chapel; 53.02565°N 1.48436°W		1818	The Baptist chapel, later a Sunday school, and then converted for other purposes, is in stone with moulded eaves and a hipped slate roof. There are two storeys and three bays. The central doorway has massive quoins, and the windows are sashes.	II
Former savings bank 53.02659°N 1.48517°W		1818	The original part is at the rear, with the front added in 1912. The bank is in stone, and the later part is in Edwardian Baroque style. It has a single storey and five bays, the outer bays projecting under pedimented gables with carving in the tympani. In the left bay is a round-headed doorway with a fanlight, over which is a swag, and the other bays contain windows. At the top is a panelled balustraded parapet.	II
St Peter's Church; 53.02524°N 1.47847°W		1822–24	A Commissioners' church, it was designed by Matthew Habershon, and restored in 1884. The church is built in gritstone, and consists of a nave, a sanctuary with a shallow apse and flanking vestries, and a west tower. The tower is slender, the ground floor forming a porch, with angle buttresses rising to polygonal turrets, a quatrefoil band, clock faces, and an embattled parapet. There are also embattled parapets along the nave, the apse has flying buttresses, and inside the church are galleries on three sides on cast iron columns.	II
Central Methodist Church; 53.02213°N 1.48503°W		1825	The church is in stone with an eaves cornice and blocking course. There are two storeys and a symmetrical front of five bays, the middle three bays projecting slightly under a pediment. In the centre is a porch with Tuscan pilasters and a pediment, and the windows are sashes. Inside the church is a horseshoe-shaped gallery on cast iron columns.	II
63, 65 and 67 Bridge Street; 53.02527°N 1.48524°W		Early 19th century	A row of four stone shops with a tile roof, and a coped gable on the right. There are two storeys and four bays. The left three bays contain doorways with fanlights and shop windows. In the right bay is a flattened segmental carriage arch with a keystone grooved to resemble voussoirs, containing a recessed shop front. The windows in the upper floor are sashes.	II
134 Bridge Street; 53.02720°N 1.48553°W		Early 19th century	A house on a corner site, later used for other purposes. It is in stone with a hipped slate roof. There are three storeys, three bays on Bridge Street, two wider bays on Long Row, and a canted bay on the corner. On the Bridge Street front is a shop window, and the other windows are sashes, those on Long Row tripartite.	II
7 and 9 Cheapside; 53.02248°N 1.47987°W		Early 19th century	A pair of stone cottages with a moulded floor band and a slate roof. There are two storeys and four bays. The windows are sashes with hood moulds, and No. 7 also has a small single-light window, under which is a passage entry.	II
21, 22 and 23 Derby Road, Milford; 53.00640°N 1.48203°W	—	Early 19th century	A row of three stone houses with quoins, bands, swept eaves, and a slate roof. There are two storeys and attics, and nine bays. The doorways have pilasters and flat hoods on consoles, the windows are sashes, and there are three dormers.	II
47 Derby Road; 53.01639°N 1.48277°W	—	Early 19th century	A house in red brick with stone dressings, corner pilasters, an eaves cornice, and a hipped slate roof. There are two storeys, and three bays, the middle bay projecting slightly under a pediment. The central doorway has pilasters and a rectangular fanlight, and the windows are sashes.	II
93 Derby Road; 53.01479°N 1.48252°W	—	Early 19th century	A house in red brick with stone dressings, corner pilasters, an eaves cornice, and a hipped slate roof. There are two storeys, and three bays, the middle bay projecting slightly under a pediment. The central doorway has pilasters and a rectangular fanlight, and the windows are sashes.	II
171 and 173 Far Laund; 53.03626°N 1.46413°W	—	Early 19th century	A stone house with a tile roof, three storeys and three bays. The central doorway has a bracketed hood, and the windows are later replacements.	II
2 and 3 Foundry Lane, Milford; 53.00612°N 1.48203°W	—	Early 19th century	A pair of stone houses with a tile roof, two storeys and four bays. On the front are two porches, and the windows are casements, those in the ground floor with mullions.	II
1 High Street; 53.02412°N 1.47853°W		Early 19th century	A stone house with quoins and a slate roof, overlooking a road junction. There are three storeys, a front of three bays, a central doorway, and sash windows. The southwest front is roughcast, and has two gables.	II
65 Hopping Hill, Milford; 53.00513°N 1.47958°W	—	Early 19th century	A stone house with a pantile roof and two storeys. There is an L-shaped plan, with a main range of three bays and a projecting wing on the right. The windows are sashes, and at the street boundary is a stone coped wall.	II
12 and 14 Lander Lane and 1 The Butts; 53.02361°N 1.47728°W		Early 19th century	A block of houses and a shop on a corner site. It is in red brick with stone dressings, stone at the rear, moulded stone eaves, and hipped slate roofs. The main block has three storeys, a front of six bays, a canted bay on the corner, and one bay on High Pavement. Beyond this is a two storey two-bay wing. On the corner is a shop front, the doorways have pilasters, friezes and cornices. The windows are sashes, those in the ground floor with hood moulds, and those in the middle floor with hood moulds on consoles. In the right bay is a segmental-arched carriage entrance with a rusticated surround. In the middle floor of the corner bay is a recessed blind round arch. The rear wing has a plinth and quoins, and contains sash windows and a round-headed doorway with a rusticated surround.	II
5 and 6 Long Row; 53.02738°N 1.48450°W		Early 19th century	A pair of red brick houses at the end of a terrace, with the left gable wall in stone. There are two storeys, and each house has one bay. The doorways in the centre have cambered heads, and the windows are sashes.	II
1–3 Moscow Cottages; 52.99623°N 1.48593°W	—	Early 19th century	A group of cottages in stone with a tile roof, in 17th-century style. There are two storeys and an H-shaped plan, with a central range, and projecting wings with coped gables. The doorway has a pedimented canopy on brackets, and the windows are mullioned with two lights, and hood moulds.	II
43 and 45 Park Side; 53.02325°N 1.47394°W	—	Early 19th century	A pair of cottages at the end of a terrace in stone with a slate roof. There are two storeys and an attic, and two bays. The doorways have architraves, and the windows are small-pane sashes, all with dressed lintels. The cottages are approached by steps, with iron railings incorporating a foot scraper.	II
Wall and gate piers, 66 The Fleet; 53.01779°N 1.48134°W	—	Early 19th century	The wall between the garden and the street is in stone with half-rounded coping, and is about 5 feet (1.5 m) high. There are two gate piers, each with a tooled centre panel and a cushion cap with similar tooling.	II
3–7 Wyver Lane; 53.03099°N 1.48684°W	—	Early 19th century	A terrace of stone three houses with three storeys and one bay each. The doorways have plain surrounds, the windows are casements, and at the rear is a boundary wall.	II
17–27 Wyver Lane; 53.03140°N 1.48602°W	—	Early 19th century	Three pairs of symmetrical houses in stone with slate roofs. There are two storeys, and each house has three bays and a central doorway. Most of the windows are sashes, and the others are later replacements.	II
Belle Acre; 53.02153°N 1.48214°W	—	Early 19th century	A large rendered house at right angles to the road, with a tile roof and coped gables and kneelers. There are two storeys, a south front of four bays, and sash windows.	II
Broadholme House Farmhouse; 53.04427°N 1.47798°W		Early 19th century	The farmhouse is in stone with quoins, moulded eaves, and a hipped slate roof. There are two storeys, an entrance front on the side with three bays, and two bays facing the road. The doorway is in the centre of the entrance front, and the windows are sashes, those in the ground floor with hood moulds.	II
Farm buildings, Broadholme House Farm; 53.04448°N 1.47777°W		Early 19th century	The farm buildings are in stone, and have tile roofs with coped gables and kneelers. There are two storeys, and the buildings form three sides of a courtyard.	II
Monuments, Central Methodist Churchyard; 53.02210°N 1.48460°W		Early 19th century	In the churchyard are three monuments to the memory of the Bourne family. They are in stone, and one is a large monument with a square base and corner pilasters, surmounted by an urn with swags. The other monuments are chest tombs dated 1815 and 1819, with reeded corners and engraved slate slabs.	II
Crossroads Farmhouse; 53.02710°N 1.49988°W		Early 19th century	The farmhouse is in stone with sill bands, an eaves cornice, and a slate roof. The main block has three storeys and four bays, to the east is a wing with two storeys and four bays, projecting from each end of the main block are single-storey wings, and to the east of the east wing is a single-storey six-bay section. The main block has a doorway with a hood on brackets, and another doorway to the right. The first and third bays contain mullioned windows, and in the other bays are blind windows.	II*
Boundary wall, Crossroads Farm; 53.02684°N 1.50016°W	—	Early 19th century	The wall between the street and the embanked garden is in stone. It is coped, and ramped down the slope.	II
Two ranges of farm buildings, Crossroads Farm; 53.02740°N 1.49963°W		Early 19th century	The farm buildings to the northeast of the farmhouse form two ranges. The northeast range has a cast iron frame, brick walls faced with stone, and a slate roof with vents. There are two storeys and an external staircase. The southwest range is in stone, with one, two or three storeys, and contains an arched entrance. At the rear is a large stone trough, and at the entrance are stone gate piers with pyramidal caps.	II
Southern range of farm buildings, Crossroads Farm; 53.02722°N 1.49919°W	—	Early 19th century	Most of the buildings in the range are in stone with slate roofs. They include two tall cart sheds with open fronts, and a two-storey building in stone and brick with stable doors, windows, vents and loft doors. At the rear is a stone two-storey building with a carriage arch over which is a roof hopper, and containing loft doors and windows, and to the south is a single-storey range.	II
Western building, Crossroads Farm; 53.02689°N 1.50047°W	—	Early 19th century	The building is in stone and has a slate roof with coped gables. There is a single storey on the front facing the road, and two storeys on the south front. In the south front is a carriageway arch with brick lining at the west end, in the ground floor are a stable door, vents, and nine windows, and the upper floor contains eleven windows, some blocked. At the east end is a stone trough.	II
Western ranges, Crossroads Farm; 53.02741°N 1.49904°W	—	Early 19th century	There are three western ranges of the northeast farmyard. The northern range is in brick with one front in stone, a corrugated iron roof, vents, a loft door, and an external staircase. The east-west building is at right angles, in stone with a hipped corrugated iron roof and two storeys, and contains three windows and a loft door over a doorway with a quadripartite fanlight. The south range is in stone with a slate roof, a single storey and five bays, and four vents on the roof.	II
Cartshed, Derby Road, Milford; 53.00467°N 1.47889°W	—	Early 19th century	The cartshed is in stone with a slate roof. Its open side faces the northwest and has a cast iron stanchion supporting the roof.	II
Northeastern range, Dalley Farm; 53.02938°N 1.49860°W	—	Early 19th century	The farm buildings are in stone with slate roofs, and form an L-shaped plan. The buildings consist of a hay barn with an open front supported on iron posts, and with a double row of vents. Adjoining is a cart shed, and a shelter shed with an arcaded front and stone pillars.	II*
Northern range, Dalley Farm; 53.02918°N 1.49893°W	—	Early 19th century	A variety of farm buildings in red brick and stone, with roofs of slate and tile, and including gabled cross-wings. The openings vary, and include various doors and windows, pitching holes, and vents, and there are external stone staircases.	II*
Stable range and carriageway entrance, Dalley Farm; 53.02901°N 1.49907°W	—	Early 19th century	The stable range and entrance are in stone with roofs of tile and slate. Above the carriage entrance are massive lintels, and a gable with a small casement window and a clock face. It is flanked by a stone staircase, and to the right are two stable doors, two windows, and a pitching hole.	II*
Western range of west farmyard, Dalley Farm; 53.02899°N 1.49934°W	—	Early 19th century	A stable range with a loft above, it is in red brick on the east front, and in stone at the rear. It contains stable doors, windows, loft doors, and two rows of rectangular vents. At the end are blocked pitching holes.	II*
Walls and steps, Dalley Farm; 53.02897°N 1.49882°W	—	Early 19th century	The walls form the boundaries of the eastern farmyard, and the farm complex. They are in stone with coping, and in the northwest angle there are steps.	II*
Drinking trough 53.02455°N 1.49927°W	—	Early 19th century	The drinking trough is on the west side of Farnah Green Road at the foot of a hill. It is in stone and set in a recess in a field wall.	II
Lodge, Field Head House; 53.02578°N 1.47732°W		Early 19th century	The lodge is in stone, with corbelled eaves, and has a single storey. The corner is rounded, and it contains a doorway with an architrave, a Tudor arched head, and a hood mould. Above it is a single-light window, and a shaped coped gable with kneelers. The windows on the sides are transomed or mullioned and transomed.	II
Fleet Cottage; 53.01786°N 1.48146°W		Early 19th century	Two adjoining houses at right angles to the street, with tile roofs, two storeys, and two bays each. The right house is in stone and has a central doorway and sash windows. The left house is lower, in painted brick, and has sash windows with moulded frames. In the gable end facing the street is a loft doorway, and at the rear is a recessed single-storey former shop.	II
Fleet House; 53.01961°N 1.47974°W		Early 19th century	A stone house that has a slate roof with kneelers. There are two storeys and three bays. In the centre is a trellis porch with a tented canopy flanked by French windows, and the upper floor contains sash windows. In the right return is a small window with a reset dated lintel.	II
Makeney Terrace; 52.99614°N 1.47676°W		Early 19th century	A terrace of eight back to back houses in stone, with moulded eaves and a hipped slate roof. There are two storeys, each house has two bays, and the windows are a mix of sashes, casements, and later glazing.	II
Post Office, Milford; 53.00269°N 1.47755°W		Early 19th century	A stone cottage with a tile roof, two storeys and two bays. The doorway has a stone lintel, to its right is a small canted bay window, and to its left is a shop window. In the upper floor are casement windows.	II
Nailer's workshop, Joseph Street; 53.02628°N 1.48264°W		Early 19th century	The former workshop is in stone with a tile roof, the gable end towards the street, There is a single storey, and the front facing the street contains a stable door.	II
Northfield; 53.02865°N 1.48461°W		Early 19th century	A stone house with a hipped slate roof, two storeys and three bays. The central round-arched doorway has a coved archivolt and a fanlight with radial tracery. To its left is a canted bay window, to the right is a square bay window, and in the upper floor are sash windows.	II
Former Post Office; 53.02702°N 1.48574°W		Early 19th century	The former post office is in stone with a slate roof, two storeys and three bays. It has a shop front with pilasters, a cornice and a central doorway, and the windows are sashes. To the right is a coped stone wall.	II
Quarry Bends House; 53.00231°N 1.47768°W		Early 19th century	A stone cottage with a slate roof. There are two storeys and three bays, and a single-storey rear outshut. In the centre is a segmental-arched carriageway now containing a doorway and a window, and elsewhere the windows have been altered.	II
Farm buildings, Redhill Farm; 52.99513°N 1.47564°W		Early 19th century	The farm buildings are in stone with a slate roof. There is an L-shaped plan, consisting of a long range and a short gabled wing, and they contain stables and cowsheds, and a loft above. In the north front are two segmental arches and rectangular vents.	II
The King William public house 53.00218°N 1.47782°W		Early 19th century	The public house is in stone with a stone slate roof. There are three storeys, five bays, and a two-storey wing to the north. On the front is a doorway with an inn sign above, and the windows are sashes with some later replacements.	II
Wyver Farmhouse; 53.04262°N 1.49497°W	—	Early 19th century	The farmhouse is in stone with a slate roof. It is in two parts, each part with two storeys and three bays, the right part recessed and lower. The entrance is in the lower part, and the windows are iron-framed casements with centre opening lights. The house is separated from the farmyard by a coped wall.	II
Boundary wall, Wyver Farm; 53.04194°N 1.49485°W	—	Early 19th century	The walls are in stone, and at the west side of the drive at the rear of the farm buildings.	II
Farm building northwest of farmhouse, Wyver Farm; 53.04274°N 1.49544°W	—	Early 19th century	The building to the northwest of the farmhouse is in stone with a slate roof. There are two storeys, and a rectangular plan. In the front is a wagon entrance, over which is a partly blocked truncated triangular window. On the west side are external steps to an upper floor door.	II
Southeast farm buildings and walls, Wyver Farm; 53.04236°N 1.49436°W	—	Early 19th century	The farm buildings are in stone with slate roofs, and the walls are in red brick and stone. The buildings form a double-L-shaped plan. The northwest range has two storeys and three bays, and external steps, and contains doors and pitching holes. A wall connects it with the west range that contains stable doors, loft doors and vents, and another wall connects this to the farm entrance.	II
Southwest farm buildings, walls and gate piers, Wyver Farm; 53.04218°N 1.49463°W	—	Early 19th century	The structures form four sides of a courtyard. The farm buildings are in stone and red and white brick, and have tile roofs. The southeast range has two storeys, and contains stable doors, windows, pitching holes, and vents. The southwest range has a single storey, and contains windows and doors. The other two sides of the courtyard are filled by stone walls with stone gate piers.	II
Western range, Wyver Farm; 53.04244°N 1.49516°W	—	Early 19th century	The farm buildings are in stone with a slate roof, and form an obtuse angle, with two storeys at the front and one at the rear. There are seven windows, in front is a range of pigsties, and incorporated in the range is a dog kennel.	II
Almshouses; 53.02367°N 1.47617°W		1829	The almshouses are in stone, with quoins, a floor band, and a hipped tile roof. There are two storeys and a symmetrical front of five bays. In the centre is a porch with a window on the front, side doors, a cornice, and a blocking course. Above it is a plaque and a gable with kneelers containing a cartouche, and in the outer bays are single-light or mullioned windows.	II
Building 51, Milford Dyehouse; 53.00259°N 1.47903°W		1832	The dyehouse is in stone with a hipped slate roof. There are two storeys, an L-shaped plan, and fronts of eight and two bays. The windows are iron-framed casements, and in the upper floor are double loading doors.	II
Chimney, Milford Dyehouse; 53.00267°N 1.47968°W		1832 (probable)	The chimney of the dyehouse is in brick, it is tall, and circular.	II
Former George Brettle's Warehouse; 53.02182°N 1.48468°W		1834–35	Originally the warehouse for a manufacturer of hosiery, later converted into a retail centre, the building is in stone with slate roofs. The main block has three storeys and a symmetrical front, with a central section of 13 bays, and three bays at the ends slightly projecting under pediments. On the front is a segmental-headed cart entrance with an adjacent mounting block. Most of the windows are fixed, and some are sashes. At the rear is a northern two-storey wing with a hipped roof, and to its south is a two-storey three-bay section with a parapet. Further to the south is a single-storey red brick building with nine arched windows.	II*
17 Belper Lane; 53.03155°N 1.48696°W		Early to mid 19th century	Originally a lodge to Bridge Hill House, later a private house, it is in stone with a corbelled band between the floors, and wide bracketed eaves. There are two storeys, one gable on the south front, and two small gables on the west front. On the west front is a porch, and the windows are mullioned with three lights, and contain casements.	II
18 and 20 Bridge Foot; 53.02998°N 1.48723°W		Early to mid 19th century	A cottage hospital, later a private house, it is a long building in red brick with a slate roof. There are two storeys and four bays. The windows are sashes, some with slightly cambered heads.	II
Gate piers and wall, Derby Road; 53.01952°N 1.48500°W	—	Early to mid 19th century	The gate piers at the entrance to the playing fields are in stone with pyramidal caps. To the south is a quadrant stone wall ending in a pier.	II
Forge Cottage; 53.00044°N 1.47881°W		Early to mid 19th century	A stone cottage on a plinth with moulded eaves and a slate roof. There are two storeys, a front of three bays, and a rear cross wing. The windows on the front are iron-framed casements, and the middle window in the upper floor is blind.	II
Gibfield Lodge, wall and pier 53.01958°N 1.48498°W		Early to mid 19th century	The former lodge is in stone, with angle and centre pilasters, a braced eaves band, and a hipped slate roof. There is a single storey and fronts of two bays. The doorway faces the drive, and the windows are replacement casements. Attached to the northeast corner of the lodge is a quadrant wall with an end pier.	II
Quarry Cottages; 53.00279°N 1.47756°W	—	Early to mid 19th century	A pair of stone cottages with a tile roof. There are two storeys and each cottage has two bays. The windows are casements, each cottage has an off-centre doorway, and the right cottage has another doorway to the right.	II
The Cedars; 53.02609°N 1.48117°W		Early to mid 19th century	A house, later used for other purposes, in stone, with pilasters flanking the central bay, an eaves band, and a hipped slate roof. There are two storeys and a symmetrical front of three bays. In the centre is a stone porch, and the windows are sashes.	II
The Lawn and Lawn Cottage; 53.02660°N 1.46781°W	—	Early to mid 19th century	A large house, later divided, the front is rendered, the side wall is in red brick, and the roof is slated. There are two storeys and a front of three bays. In the centre is a stone porch, this is flanked by canted bay windows, and the other windows are sashes, those on the side with hood moulds.	II
Gate piers and garden wall, The Lawn and Lawn Cottage; 53.02643°N 1.46763°W	—	Early to mid 19th century	The wall running along the road in front of the gardens is in stone with coping, and is stepped down the hillside. It contains two stone gate piers with pyramidal caps.	II
The Lion Hotel; 53.02432°N 1.48474°W		Early to mid 19th century	The hotel is in stone, rendered on the front, and has full-height pilasters on the corners and flanking the entrance bay with Greek key-like capitals. It is in two parts under the same roofline, each part with three bays and sash windows. The south part has three storeys, in the ground floor are pub windows, the middle floor windows have triangular pediments and in the top floor are four windows and a sill band. The left part has two storeys, with a shop front on the left two bays with pilasters and a cornice, and a carriageway converted into a recessed entrance in the right bay. The upper floor contains windows with segmental pediments.	II
The Nag's Head public house 53.02361°N 1.47794°W		Early to mid 19th century	The public house, which may have an earlier core, is in stone with a slate roof. There are two storeys and a symmetrical front of three bays, the outer bays gabled. The central doorway has pilasters and a pediment, and the windows are sashes with moulded surrounds.	II
Former Unitarian Sunday School; 53.02398°N 1.48018°W		Early to mid 19th century (probable)	The Sunday school, later used for other purposes, is in roughcast brick, with a slate roof. There are two storeys and three bays. In the centre is a doorway with a cornice, over which is an inscribed plaque, and a tall window with a wedge lintel. The ground floor windows have small panes and central opening lights, and in the upper floor are sash windows.	II
Chevin Road Bridge; 53.00597°N 1.48557°W		1836–40	The bridge was built by the North Midland Railway to carry Chevin Road over its line. It is in sandstone with gritstone dressings and a brick soffit, and consists of a single segmental skew arch with a span of 30 feet (9.1 m). The bridge has rusticated voussoirs springing from impost bands, a moulded cornice, parapets with moulded coping, abutments with quoins on a plinth, and splayed wing walls ending in half-hexagonal piers.	II
Gibfield Lane Bridge; 53.01868°N 1.48311°W	—	1836–40	The bridge was built by the North Midland Railway to carry Gibfield Lane over its line. It is in gritstone with a brick soffit, and consists of a single segmental skew arch. The bridge has rusticated voussoirs, and parapets with moulded coping. The cutting walls extend from the southeast corner of the bridge for about 215 metres (705 ft), and contain five broad projecting pilasters.	II
King Street Bridge; 53.02325°N 1.48245°W		1836–40	The bridge was built by the North Midland Railway to carry King Street over its line. It is in sandstone with gritstone dressings, and consists of a single segmental skew arch with a span of 30 feet (9.1 m). The bridge has voussoirs springing from impost bands, a moulded cornice, and parapets with moulded coping. On the north side the abutments are in sandstone and the parapet is in concrete and red brick. In about 1973, the bridge was extended to the north with a concrete deck 48 metres (157 ft) long.	II
Matlock Road Bridge; 53.03086°N 1.48313°W		1836–40	The bridge was built by the North Midland Railway to carry Matlock Road (A6 road) over its line. It is in gritstone with a brick soffit, and consists of a single segmental skew arch with a span of 30 feet (9.1 m). The bridge has rusticated voussoirs, concave piers with quoins, and parapets with moulded copings. The abutments are angled out, and the wing walls curve, ending in semi-octagonal piers.	II
Strutts Bridge; 53.00898°N 1.48476°W		1836–40	An accommodation bridge built by the North Midland Railway to carry a track over its line. It is in sandstone with gritstone dressings and a brick soffit, and consists of a single segmental arch with a span of 30 feet (9.1 m). The bridge has rusticated voussoirs springing from impost bands, parapets with moulded copings, and the wing walls that curve and end in semi-octagonal piers.	II
New Road Bridge; 53.02170°N 1.48253°W		1837–40	The bridge was built by the North Midland Railway to carry New Road (A609 road) over its line. It is in sandstone with gritstone dressings and a brick soffit, and consists of a single segmental arch with a span of 30 feet (9.1 m). The bridge has voussoirs springing from impost bands, concave piers with quoins, a moulded cornice, and parapets. The abutments are angled out to meet flanking piers.	II
Derby Road Bridge; 53.01657°N 1.48332°W	—	1837–40	The bridge was built by the North Midland Railway to carry Derby Road (A6 road) over its line. It is in sandstone with gritstone dressings and a brick soffit, and consists of a single segmental arch with a span of 30 feet (9.1 m). The bridge has voussoirs springing from impost bands, concave piers with quoins, parapets with moulded coping, abutments with pitched coping, and splayed wing walls ending in half-hexagonal piers.	II
Footbridge; 53.02859°N 1.48327°W		1837–40	The footbridge was built by the North Midland Railway as an accommodation bridge to carry Pingle Lane over its line. It is in gritstone with a brick soffit, and consists of a single segmental arch. The bridge has voussoirs springing from impost bands, parapets with moulded coping, and slightly splayed abutments ending in quoins.	II
Railway cutting walls 53.02584°N 1.48300°W	—	1837–40	The railway cutting was built by the North Midland Railway to carry its line through the centre of the town. There are two sections, the northern section is about 55 yards (50 m) long and the southern section about 45 yards (41 m) long. The walls are lined in gritstone and have a concave section, rising from a plinth. At intervals there are pilasters rising to a layer of moulding, over which is a parapet with saddleback copings.	II
Eastern walls and piers, Babington Hospital; 53.01861°N 1.48500°W		1838–39	The walls running along the eastern boundary of the hospital grounds were designed by George Gilbert Scott. They are in stone with coping, and the gate piers are square with pyramidal caps.	II
Main entrance lodge, Babington Hospital; 53.01895°N 1.48504°W		1838–39	Built as the gatehouse to the former workhouse, it was designed by George Gilbert Scott and William Bonython Moffatt, and is in Jacobean style. It is in stone with quoins, a slate roof with coped gables, and two storeys. In the centre is a round arch with imposts and a keystone, over which is an oriel window, and a gable with kneelers and finials. The side wings contain mullioned windows, and most of the windows have latticed glazing.	II
North lodge, Babington Hospital; 53.01936°N 1.48501°W		1838–39	The lodge was designed by George Gilbert Scott and William Bonython Moffatt in Jacobean style. It is in stone and has a slate roof with coped gables. There is a single storey, with a doorway on the front facing the drive, and on the front facing the road is a three-light mullioned window.	II
North range, Eastern courtyard, Babington Hospital; 53.01923°N 1.48536°W		1838–39	Part of a workhouse designed by George Gilbert Scott and William Bonython Moffatt in Jacobean style, it is in stone with quoins and a slate roof. In one and two storeys, it has an L-shaped plan. The windows are mullioned, or mullioned and transomed.	II
South range, Eastern courtyard, Babington Hospital; 53.01869°N 1.48543°W	—	1838–39	Part of a workhouse designed by George Gilbert Scott and William Bonython Moffatt in Jacobean style, it is in stone with quoins and a slate roof. In one and two storeys, it has an L-shaped plan. The windows are mullioned, or mullioned and transomed	II
West range, Eastern courtyard, Babington Hospital; 53.01913°N 1.48562°W		1838–39	Part of a workhouse designed by George Gilbert Scott and William Bonython Moffatt in Jacobean style, it is in stone with quoins and a slate roof. In the centre is a section with three storeys and attics and three bays. In the middle bay is a doorway with a Tudor arch, above which are mullioned and transomed windows and a dormer with a shaped gable. The outer bays contain three-storey canted bay windows, and above each is a gabled dormer. On the centre of the roof is a lantern. Flanking the centre part are wings with two storeys, five bays, and three gabled dormers each.	II
11–21 Cheapside; 53.02229°N 1.48013°W		c. 1840	A terrace of twelve houses in red brick with a slate roof. There are two storeys and twelve bays, and alternating wide and narrow gables with scalloped bargeboards. On the front are six gabled porches with similar bargeboards, and doorways with tripartite fanlights and hood moulds. The windows are sashes with hood moulds, and in the centre is a passageway.	II
North portal, Milford Tunnel; 53.00528°N 1.48571°W		1840	The tunnel was built by the North Midland Railway and designed by Frederick Swanwick. The north portal is in gritstone, and is a horseshoe arch with seven rings. The central ring is concave, and the others are semicircular, all springing from plinths with impost mouldings. Surrounding the portal is a stone retaining wall.	II*
Stone arch, southern entrance, Milford Tunnel; 52.99841°N 1.48772°W	—	1840	The tunnel was built by the North Midland Railway and designed by Frederick Swanwick. The arch is in stone and is a horseshoe arch with concentric semicircular rings, and is less decorative than the north portal.	II
The Tower; 53.00232°N 1.48663°W		1840	The tower was built by the North Midland Railway over Milford Tunnel. It is in stone with a square plan, four storeys, and an opening on each floor, and it is without a roof.	II
Railway bridge, Field Lane; 53.02551°N 1.48279°W		1840	The bridge was built by the North Midland Railway to carry Field Lane over its line. It is in gritstone and consists of an elliptical arch. The surround is rusticated, and there are quoins, voussoirs, impost bands, a band over the arch, and a coped parapet.	II
Railway bridge, Joseph Street; 53.02620°N 1.48296°W		1840	The bridge was built by the North Midland Railway to carry Joseph Street over its line. It is in gritstone and consists of an elliptical arch. The surround is rusticated, and there are quoins, voussoirs, impost bands, a band over the arch, and a coped parapet.	II
Railway bridge, George Street; 53.02649°N 1.48302°W		1840	The bridge was built by the North Midland Railway to carry George Street over its line. It is in gritstone and consists of an elliptical arch. The surround is rusticated, and there are quoins, voussoirs, impost bands, a band over the arch, and a coped parapet.	II
Railway bridge, William Street; 53.02674°N 1.48307°W		1840	The bridge was built by the North Midland Railway to carry William Street over its line. It is in gritstone and consists of an elliptical arch. The surround is rusticated, and there are quoins, voussoirs, impost bands, a band over the arch, and a coped parapet.	II
Railway bridge, Long Row; 53.02731°N 1.48314°W		1840	The bridge was built by the North Midland Railway to carry Long Row over its line. It is in gritstone and consists of an elliptical arch. The surround is rusticated, and there are quoins, voussoirs, impost bands, a band over the arch, and a coped parapet.	II
Former Wesleyan Chapel, Milford; 53.00329°N 1.48058°W	—	1842	The former chapel is in stone with a hipped slate roof. There are two storeys on a high plinth, and sides of three bays. In the centre of the entrance front is a doorway, and the windows are sashes. Projecting from the front is a single-storey building with a hipped roof.	II
Holy Trinity Church, Milford; 53.00452°N 1.47818°W		1846–48	The church was designed by William Bonython Moffatt in Early English style, and the vestry and a church room were added in 1910. It is in stone with a tile roof, and consists of a nave, a north aisle, a south porch, a lower chancel with a vestry, and a northwest polygonal turret. The windows are lancets, and in the chancel they are paired.	II
Old Police Station; 53.02834°N 1.48493°W		1848	The former police station is in stone, with quoins, wide eaves, and a hipped slate roof. There are two storeys, three bays, the left bay recessed, and a rear wing. The doorway has a quoined surround, and the windows are sashes, some blind.	II
Milford Baptist Chapel; 53.00370°N 1.48092°W		1849	The chapel is in stone on a rusticated plinth, with a hipped slate roof. The central doorway has a flat hood on scrolled brackets, and the windows have round arches, archivolts, impost bands, and keystones. The churchyard is enclosed by a wall with railings containing two gate piers with pyramidal caps, and the gates are in iron.	II
Christ Church; 53.02742°N 1.48610°W		1849–50	The church is in stone and in Early English style. It consists of a single cell, without aisles, and with a triple bellcote at the west end. At the east end are turrets with spirelets, and flying buttresses at the base. The windows are lancets, with three at the east end, and five along the sides.	II
41–47 Bridge Street; 53.02428°N 1.48516°W		Mid 19th century	A row of four stuccoed houses with a slate roof and four small gables with finials, each containing a small rectangular opening. There are two storeys and four bays. In the centre is a projecting gabled porch, with a blind opening in the gable and a finial, sash windows on the front and doorways on the sides. The other doorways are in the outer bays, and all have fanlights. The windows are sashes, and all the openings have cornices. In front of the gardens is a low coped wall.	II
115 Bridge Street; 53.02647°N 1.48546°W		Mid 19th century	A shop on a corner site on a plinth, in red brick, painted on the front. There are three storeys, a front of two bays, and a two-storey rear wing in stone. In the ground floor is a shop front with pilasters, a cornice on consoles with iron cresting, and ball finials. The windows are sashes.	II
Gate piers, gates and wall, Central Methodist Church; 53.02216°N 1.48456°W		19th century	The wall running along the eastern boundary of the churchyard is in stone with pyramidal coping. The gate piers have pyramidal caps, and the gates are in cast iron.	II
East range, Chevin House Farm; 53.01419°N 1.49201°W	—	Mid 19th century	The range of farm buildings originated as stables with a loft. They are in stone and have two storeys. Inside are the original stalls, and the partitions are in cast iron with ball finials. The farmyard is paved with stone setts.	II
West and north ranges, Chevin House Farm; 53.01422°N 1.49232°W	—	Mid 19th century	The two ranges are at right angles, and are in stone with slate roofs. The west range has two storeys on the farmyard side and one at the rear. The north range has a single storey and a large roof vent.	II
Stile and gate piers, Chevin Mill; 53.02575°N 1.49603°W	—	19th century	There are three piers, all monolithic with a square section and rounded tops. The stile has three stone steps on each side.	II
Gate piers and gates, Christ Church; 53.02746°N 1.48587°W		Mid 19th century	The gate piers at the north and south entrances to the church from Bridge Street are in stone. They are gabled and the gates are in iron.	II
Pump, Dalley House; 53.02904°N 1.49922°W	—	19th century	The pump and its wooden housing are at the rear of the house.	II
Pump, Short Row; 53.02703°N 1.48082°W		19th century	The pump is in a small stone walled enclosure. It is in cast iron, and has a lion head's spout, and a fluted top with a finial.	II
Three lamp posts, Long Row; 53.02726°N 1.48390°W		19th century	The three lamp posts on the south side of Long Row are in cast iron. Each lamp post has a round moulded plinth, a tall fluted shaft and cross arms, and a simple swan neck lamp bracket.	II
Wall, gate and piers, Holy Trinity Church, Milford; 53.00446°N 1.47838°W		Mid 19th century	Running along the boundary of the churchyard is a rusticated stone wall with iron railings. The gate and end piers are in stone and gabled, and the gates are in iron.	II
Walls, piers and gates, St Peter's Church; 53.02515°N 1.47990°W		19th century	The walls enclosing the churchyard are in stone with copings. The gate piers have recessed arched panels, cornices and pyramidal caps, and the gates are in cast iron.	II
Unity Mill; 53.02398°N 1.48579°W		Mid 19th century	The mill is in stone with coved bracketed eaves, and a hipped slate roof with tall vents. There are four storeys and a T-shaped plan, with ranges of about ten bays each, and an additional block in the angle. The windows are sashes.	II
Chimney, East Mill; 53.02878°N 1.48580°W		1854	The stump of the mill chimney, once a prominent feature in the landscape. It is in red brick and was tapering and polygonal, with yellow panelled brickwork and a moulded cornice.	II
Christ Church Vicarage; 53.02727°N 1.48583°W		1857	The vicarage is in stone on a plinth with a slate roof. There are two storeys and attics, and three bays, the right bay projecting and gabled. Most of the windows are mullioned and transomed, in the left bay is a gabled dormer with round-headed lights, and the right bay contains an oriel window with a panelled base.	II
Chapels, Belper Cemetery; 53.03748°N 1.47853°W		1857–59	The two chapels are identical and are linked by an archway surmounted by a steeple. The building is in stone, and in Decorated style. The archway is flanked by single-storey single-bay links, and the steeple consists of a tower with a broach spire.	II
Pear Tree Cottage; 53.00488°N 1.47877°W	—	1858	A stone cottage with a tile roof, two storeys and three bays. The doorway is in the centre, and the windows are sashes. The doorway and the ground floor windows have cambered heads and voussoirs.	II
Lodge, Belper Cemetery; 53.03761°N 1.47964°W		1859	The lodge at the entrance to the cemetery is in stone, and has a tile roof with coped gables and a flèche. It is in Gothic style and has 1½ storeys and an irregular plan. The doorway has a cusped head and a hood mould, to its right is a canted bay window, and most of the other windows are mullioned, the lights with cusped heads.	II
Entrance and boundary wall, Belper Cemetery; 53.03742°N 1.47979°W		1859	At the entrance to the cemetery are five piers, three flanking vehicle and pedestrian entrances, and the outer piers linked by quadrant walls. The piers have pyramidal caps with small gables. The wall extends along the western boundary of the cemetery, it is coped, stepped in places, and contains interval piers.	II
Ebenezer Methodist Church, Milford; 53.00209°N 1.47792°W		1859	The church is in stone with moulded eaves and a pantile roof. There are two storeys and three bays, and the windows are sashes, larger in the lower floor. The recessed entrance is gabled and on the right side.	II
Unity Mill House; 53.02357°N 1.48592°W		Late 1860s	Probably originally a warehouse, it is in stone with a slate roof. The west front is gabled, and has three bays, the outer bays canted. In the centre bay is a doorway and three stepped windows, with a circular window above. The outer bays contain three-light mullioned windows, and above are circular windows. There are four circular windows in the east front, and the south front has mullioned windows.	II
Congregational Church; 53.02577°N 1.47996°W		1870–72	The church, which has been converted for residential use, is in stone, and has a slate roof with iron cresting. It consists of a nave, a short chancel, and a southwest steeple. The steeple has a tower with a porch, and a broach spire with lucarnes. At the northwest corner is a polygonal extension, and the windows contain Decorated tracery.	II
Wall, railings and gate piers, Congregational Church; 53.02569°N 1.48034°W		Late 19th century	Running along the western boundary of the churchyard is a wall with panelled and decorative iron railings. There are two tall chamfered and gabled stone gate piers.	II
Hay barn, Moscow Farm; 52.99624°N 1.48437°W	—	Late 19th century (probable)	The hay barn in the model farm is open-fronted with eight bays. The slate roof is carried on stone piers, and it has large louvred vents.	II
The Fountain; 53.02338°N 1.47857°W		1881	The drinking fountain in Market Place is in white stone with a polygonal plan. On the shaft are blind Gothic-arched panels, and at the top is a polygonal cap and a lamp. Two faces contain granite drinking bowls with bronze lion head spouts.	II
St Elizabeth House; 53.03122°N 1.48192°W	—	1896	A large house in gritstone with slate roofs, and in Jacobean style with Arts and Crafts features. There are two storeys, attics and a basement, and an L-shaped extension on the northeast with one and two storeys. The southeast front has three bays with gables, kneelers and ball finials. In the middle bay is a porch with a balustrade, and the other parts of the front protrude under an embattled parapet. In the left bay is a stepped buttress rising to a corbel carrying a canted oriel window with an embattled parapet. Elsewhere, there are canted bay windows with embattled parapets, and all the windows are mullioned and transomed, and contain casements.	II
Bandstand, River Gardens; 53.03020°N 1.48450°W		1906	The bandstand has twelve sides, and a stone base with a wooden balustrade. The roof is supported by wooden piers, with dentilled cornices as capitals and scalloped brackets above. There is a pierced pelmet, wide projecting eaves with angle pendants, a ribbed ceiling, and an ogee-shaped roof with a finial.	II
Herbert Strutt School; 53.01861°N 1.48438°W		1907–09	The school is in stone with a roof of Westmorland slate, and is in Jacobean style. There is a U-shaped plan, with a central range of two storeys and projecting single-storey wings with coped gables. The central range has five bays, the middle three bays gabled, and on the roof is a flèche. The wings are linked by arcades to outer two-storey wings, and at the rear of the left wing is a tower. The windows are mullioned and transomed.	II
Walls, railings, steps, piers and arch, Herbert Strutt School; 53.01864°N 1.48481°W		1908	The boundaries of the school grounds are enclosed by a coped stone wall. On part of the wall in Gibfield Lane are Art Nouveau iron railings. In Derby road are two entrances with steps flanked by stone piers, each with a blank Gothic arched niche and a pyramidal cap. At the central entrance is a gateway with a moulded Tudor arch, and a hatchment in the gable above, and it is flanked by Gothic arched niches.	II
Public baths and caretaker's house 53.01870°N 1.48350°W		1910	The former public baths and house are in stone, and both have two storeys. The ground floor of the baths projects, and has five single-light windows. To the right is a round-headed doorway with a rusticated surround, and a plaque above. In the upper floor is a Venetian window, and clerestory lighting behind over the baths. The house to the right has two bays. In the left bay is a doorway with a circular window above. The right bay contains a square bay window, a three-light casement window above, and a segmental pediment.	II
Wall, piers and railings, public baths 53.01885°N 1.48358°W	—	1910	Along the boundary is a rusticated stone wall with interval piers and tall gate piers. The railings have a design in the centre of each panel with Art Nouveau influence.	II
East Mill; 53.02890°N 1.48561°W		1912	The mill is in Accrington brick on a steel frame with stone dressings, and was designed by Stott and Sons. There are seven storeys and a rectangular plan, a rear eastern wing, a single-storey section along the front, and corner towers. The southwest tower is larger and has a stone belvedere with the name and date, and all the towers have balustraded parapets. The windows in the top floor are arcaded, with archivolts and keystones. At the rear are small semicircular balconies linking the corner towers with the main body of the mill.	II
Milford War Memorial; 53.00449°N 1.47861°W		c. 1920	The war memorial stands in a circular kerbed enclosure at a road junction. It is in gritstone and consists of a tapering cross on a stepped plinth, on which there are named tablets. Behind it is a rusticated coped stone wall, the centre part raised and containing named tablets.	II
Telephone kiosk, Broadholm Lane; 53.03857°N 1.48000°W		1935	The K6 type telephone kiosk on Broadholm Lane was designed by Giles Gilbert Scott. Constructed in cast iron with a square plan and a dome, it has three unperforated crowns in the top panels.	II
Telephone kiosk, Milford; 53.00286°N 1.47760°W		1935	The K6 type telephone kiosk on Derby Road, Milford, was designed by Giles Gilbert Scott. Constructed in cast iron with a square plan and a dome, it has three unperforated crowns in the top panels.	II
Telephone kiosk, The Triangle; 53.02774°N 1.48583°W		1935	The K6 type telephone kiosk in The Triangle was designed by Giles Gilbert Scott. Constructed in cast iron with a square plan and a dome, it has three unperforated crowns in the top panels.	II
Eastern gate piers and coal shute, Moscow Farm; 52.99657°N 1.48407°W	—	Undated	Part of the farmyard and the garden are enclosed by a stone coped wall. Incorporated in the garden wall is a stone coal shute, and at the eastern entrance to the field are tall gate piers.	II
Poultry houses, Moscow Farm; 52.99671°N 1.48423°W	—	Undated	The poultry houses have an iron frame rising from a shaped iron base. Iron rods rise from the base, forming an open screen wall.	II
Ramp and walls to foldyard, Moscow Farm; 52.99617°N 1.48546°W	—	Undated	The stone coped walls enclose the foldyard on the west and south sides, and in the west wall is a range of stone troughs. On the east side of the yard is an embanked stone ramp.	II
Ranges east of Moscow Farmhouse; 52.99644°N 1.48485°W	—	Undated	The buildings are in stone with slate roofs, and have 2½ storeys and vents. In the north front are two blocked arches, and the west front has two gables, external steps and a loft door. Between the two parts of the west front is a single-storey cross-wing containing pigsties.	II*
Ranges to north, east and west of Foldyard, Moscow Farm; 52.99644°N 1.48515°W	—	Undated	The buildings are in stone with steeply pitched tile roofs and cowl vents. There is a single storey, the buildings are entered from each side, most windows are replacements, and there are blocked slots.	II*
