= Belper railway station =

Railway station in Derbyshire, England

Coordinates: 53.025°N 1.483°W

Belper
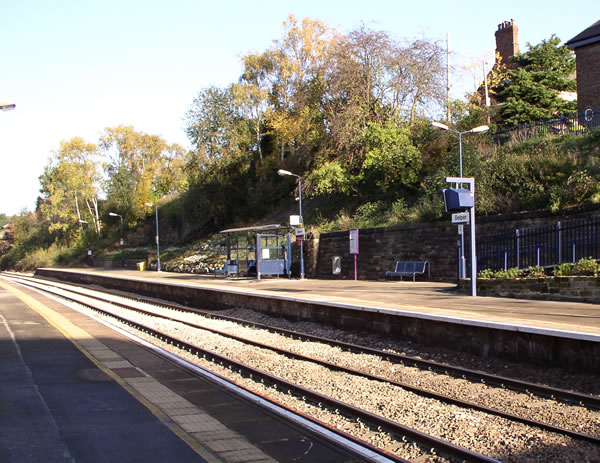
- Belper station, 2005

General information
- Location: Belper, Amber Valley; England
- Grid reference: SK348475
- Managed by: East Midlands Railway
- Platforms: 2

Other information
- Station code: BLP
- Classification: DfT category F1

Key dates
- 1840: First station opened
- 1878: Re-sited

Passengers
- 2020/21: ▼50,948
- 2021/22: ▲0.146 million
- 2022/23: ▲0.168 million
- 2023/24: ▲0.180 million
- 2024/25: ▲0.219 million
Location
Notes
- Passenger statistics from the Office of Rail and Road

Belper railway station serves the town of Belper in Derbyshire, England. The station is located on the Midland Main Line from London St Pancras to Leeds via Derby, approximately 8 miles (13 km) north of Derby.

== History ==
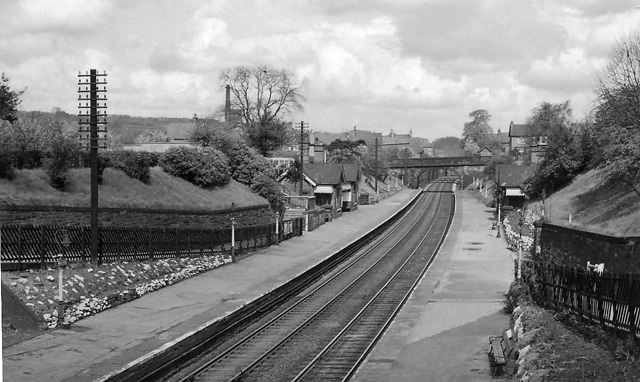
Belper railway station in 1961

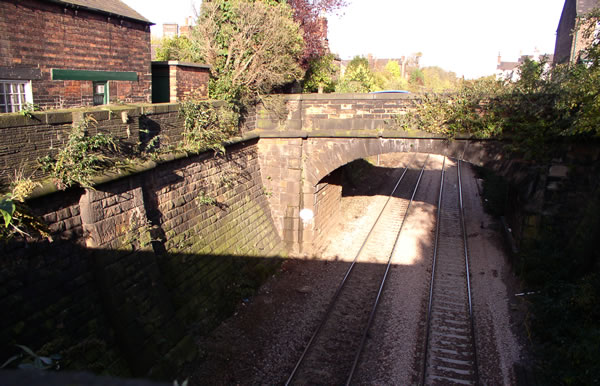
The cutting slices through a row of workers' houses

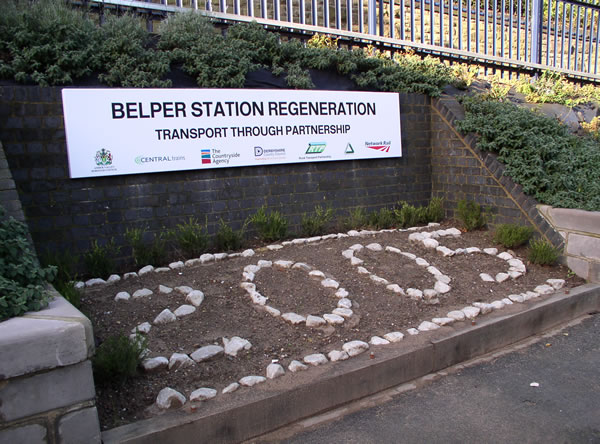
Notice commemorating the refurbishment in 2005

The line was surveyed by George Stephenson for the North Midland Railway Company, and opened in 1840. The Strutt family who had built cotton mills and had become the primary landowner, were great supporters of the line and had invested in it. They feared, however, that it would interfere with the water supply to the mill and affect both theirs and their employees' livelihood, so initially suggested in 1835 that the line should proceed by Holbrook.

This proved unsatisfactory and, in the 1836 Act authorising the line, the proposed route took it to the east of the Derwent through Milford then to the west past Belper. This "Milford Deviation" was still not acceptable, so a revised Act was approved in 1837.

This entailed the building of Milford Tunnel and the excavation of a long cutting, at enormous and unexpected expense, with eleven bridges in the space of a mile. The cutting, lined with gritstone, is now a Grade II listed building.

North of Belper, the engineers paid the penalty of following a river valley, with two long bridges over Belper Pool, plus two more, before reaching Ambergate.

The original station was built on the south side of Belper, just before the cutting, designed by Francis Thompson in an Italianate design. A coach, or omnibus, ran regularly to it from the Lion Hotel in Bridge Street. However, this proved so unpopular that the Midland Railway built a new station in 1878 within the cutting, at the town centre, next to King Street. This had platforms with access ramps for each of the two lines, both provided with waiting rooms, in the standard Midland Railway design. The booking office and other facilities were at street level. Since the new station lacked sidings, the old station remained in use for many years for the processing of goods traffic.

Originally the station was a stop on the Midland Railway's main line from London St Pancras to Manchester Central, which travelled through the Peak District.

When this line was truncated to its present terminus at Matlock in the late 1960s and following withdrawal of the Manchester trains, the station became unstaffed and in 1973 the station buildings were demolished. The bridge carrying King Street over the line was widened to make room for a number of shops, including a supermarket, which was originally Fine Fare and has subsequently had a number of occupiers, currently Poundland.

In 2005 the station was refurbished with new shelters, seats, train indicators and rubbish bins by a consortium of local volunteers, work experience trainees provided by The Groundwork Trust and the local councils, with the active support of Network Rail and Central Trains (who managed the station at that time). In April 2012 a group called Transition Belper adopted the station with the help of the Derwent Valley Line Community Rail Partnership, East Midlands Trains, Network Rail and Belper Town Council. The Community Rail Partnership continues to care for the station.

In 2009 an automatic ticket machine was installed on the Derby-bound platform, followed later by a second machine on the Matlock-bound side. These enable passengers to buy tickets (or collect those purchased in advance) before they board. In December 2009, Belper became a Penalty fare station. Where the local authority provides a discount, and if the vending machine is unable to issue discounted tickets, they can then be bought on the train.

== Services ==
All services at Belper are operated by East Midlands Railway.

The typical off-peak service is one train per hour in each direction to and from Matlock and Lincoln, via Derby, Nottingham and Newark Castle with one train every two hours extending to Cleethorpes. On Sundays, the station is served by hourly. The station is also served by a single evening service to London St Pancras International.

Preceding station	National Rail	Following station
Duffield	East Midlands Railway Derwent Valley Line	Ambergate
Derby	East Midlands Railway: Midland Main Line; Limited Service	Chesterfield
