= The Chevin (disambiguation) =

The Chevin is a hill in West Yorkshire, England

The Chevin may also refer to :

- The Chevin (band), an English post-punk revival band, based in Leeds, formed in 2010
- The Chevin, Derbyshire, a hill in England

== See also ==
- Chevin, a synonym for the European chub
