= George Wright (bishop) =

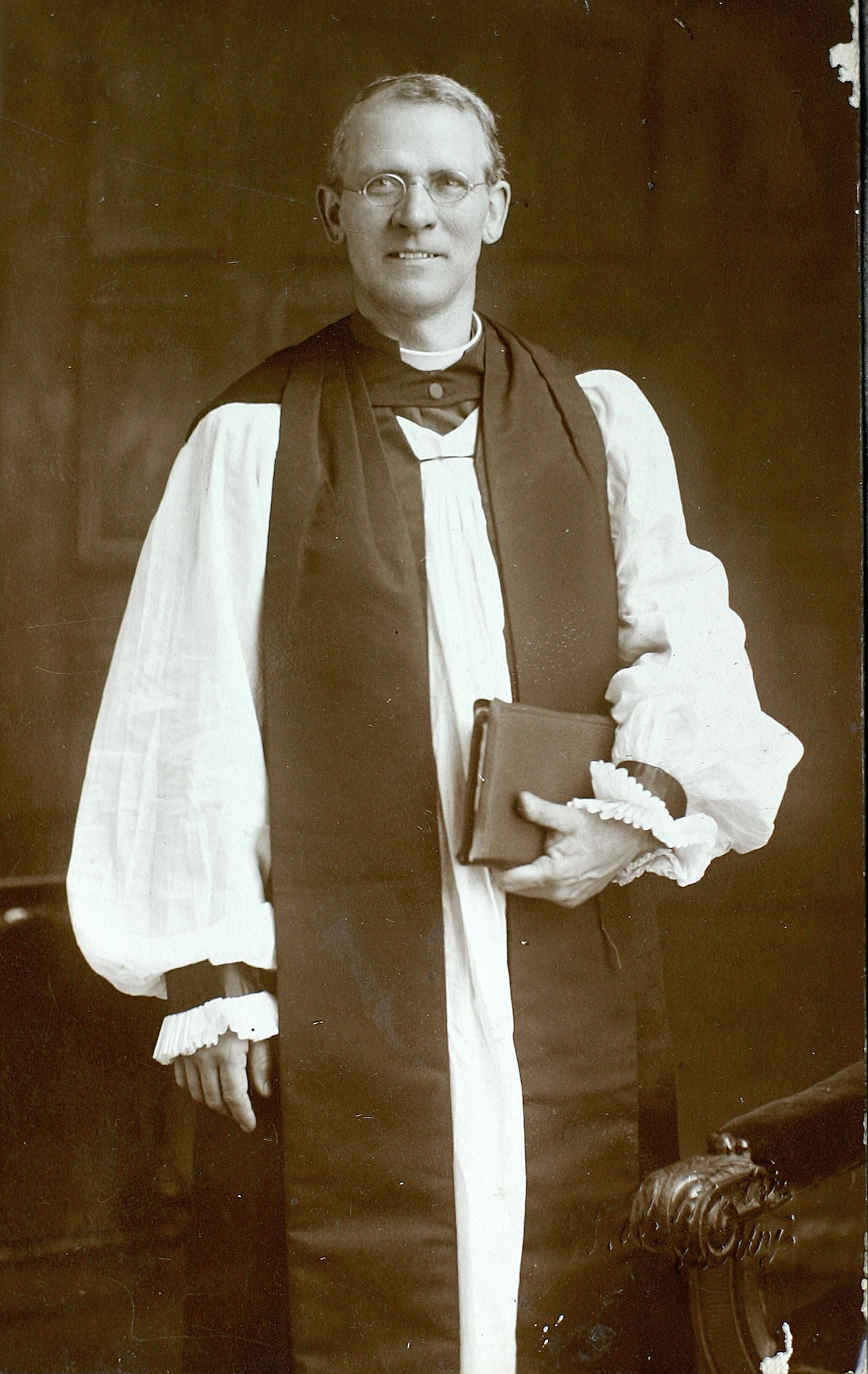
Bishop George William Wright in 1923

George William Wright was an Anglican Bishop in Africa in the mid-20th century. He was born on 17 December 1873, educated at Barnsley Grammar School and ordained in 1906 following a 15-year career as a civil servant. After a curacy at Christ Church, Derby he went as a CMS missionary to Mombasa where he remained in various capacities until 1921 when he returned to England as Vicar of Boulton. In 1923 he was consecrated Bishop of Sierra Leone and in 1936 of North Africa. He was Vicar of Templecombe from 1942 to 1951 and an Assistant Bishop in the Diocese of Bath and Wells. He died on 11 August 1956

== Early life ==
Wright's father was a postmaster in the town and at age 14 he was forced to leave Barnsley Grammar School and the scholarship he had won. Wright began working at the local postoffice serving in the various departments as messenger boy, post boy, sorting clerk and serving behind the counter. He was determined to succeed in life and took exams which bought him to London in 1894 as a second division clerk. In 1897 he was promoted into the London Postal Service. He was always interested in church work and had taught in the Sunday School at the church he attended. After hearing a sermon one Sunday from a missionary, he felt drawn to missionary work and he offered to CMS to go abroad as one of their missionaries.

== Training ==
After a period of testing Wright was accepted and sent for training at the CMS college in Islington for a period of three years, graduating with a 1st Class degree. He was head student and gained a star in Hebrew studies. He missed out on a singing scholarship to King's College Cambridge, but was ordained in 1906 and became curate at Christ Church, Derby. After only a few months in post he sailed for Mombasa in December 1906.

== Ministry and family life ==
In 1909, Wright met his future wife (Binns) on a ship en route to Frere Town. His work with CMS involved work amongst the local people, visiting, talking, taking classes, catechism and for those wishing baptism, preaching in the market place and teaching in the night school. He also worked amongst the European expats, visiting and arranging Sunday services. He became the first Chaplain for the Europeans but was criticised by local missionaries for not working exclusively amongst local Africans. He held strong convictions that if the Government officials and other expats were helped in their spiritual life they too could effectively minister to local Africans.

On 30 December 1909 Wright proposed to Anna May Binns (b. 16 July 1887) and they were married on 24 June 1910 in Frere Town and began their life together in Mombasa. He was a keen organ player and knew by heart the Hallelujah chorus of Handel's Messiah. Binns was the daughter of Rev Canon Harry Kerr Binns, Archdeacon of Mombasa.

In October 1910 the couple journeyed to Abbots Langley, England where he was in much demand as a preacher and speaker at missionary meetings around the country. He spoke at a number of venues including at the Albert Hall.

On 5 September 1911 Wright and Binns had their first child, Gordon and at age 6 weeks they returned with him to Mombasa. They had a further 7 children, Elizabeth, Philip, Doris, Basil, Hugh, Barbara and David (the last child was 'born in the purple' when Wright was Bishop).

As well as working in Mombasa, Wright travelled and ministered to the people in the Digo Country preaching and giving out simple medicines. The tribes had not been brought into contact with Christianity before he visited them.

In October 1916 the family returned to England for a furlough and left the two eldest children in England for schooling. The family returned to Africa the following October on SS Galway Castle, where they worked amongst the Wa-kikuyu. Wright regularly cycled 90 miles on his bike from Kabare to Nairobi for meetings. Wright took simple services amongst the Wa-kikuyu in a mud and wattle church which was also used as a school room. Wright managed a small dispensary and often had to extract teeth! He saw a number of converts during that time and baptised a number of local people into the Christian faith.

In 1919 the family was transferred to Mombasa to teach amongst the Indian boys in the Buxton High School. The family were separated after one of the children became ill; Wright remained in Mombasa and Binns and the children sailed back to England.

In 1921 Wright returned to England and spoke throughout the country about his missionary work abroad, speaking, preaching and sharing stores at exhibitions and meetings. In May 1921 the family moved to Boulton, Derby where Wright accepted the living of St Mary's and they moved into the vicarage in the July. During this time Wright was given honorary degrees from Oxford and Durham (DD 1923). in 1922 Wright gave a number of talks at a Missionary Exhibit in Derby. During this time he said "How can I go on appealing for people to go out as missionaries when I am not going myself?" He re-offered his services to CMS and agreed to go where ever there was need.

In July, Wright received a letter from the Archbishop of Canterbury indicating that CMS had put forward his name as a suitable candidate as the next bishop of Sierra Leone. The former bishop, John Walmsley, had also been a vicar at Christ Church, Derby. Rev G.T Manley had put forward Wright's name for consideration.

He was consecrated bishop at Westminster Abbey on 1 November 1923, by Randall Davidson, Archbishop of Canterbury; Three weeks later he sailed for Sierra Leone and his family remained in Birmingham. Besides the work in Sierra Leone, the Diocese included Rio Pongas, French Guinea, the Gambia, the Canary Islands, Madeira, the Azores, Morocco, Algeria and Tunisia. During the first five years of his post he surveyed the diocese and in 1928 Wright approached the Archbishop of Canterbury (Randall Davidson) to divide the Diocese into three. This was rejected, but Wright approached the subject a second time with the new archbishop, Cosmo Gordon Lang who decided this was a sensible project. The Diocese was split three ways with Sierra Leone remaining as a Diocese in itself. Rio Pongas and Gambia was made a diocese with their first bishop consecrated in 1935. North Africa, Madeira, Canary Islands and Azores, was made a diocese with a particular focus on working with non-Christians, which Wright agreed to oversee.

In 1936 Wright became the first bishop of North Africa. He spent much of his time travelling to visit missionaries in isolated places and holding services in their home to strengthen and support them abroad.

In 1936 Elizabeth, Wright's eldest daughter, died after contracting tuberculosis in a hospital in which she was working.

In April 1940 Wright escaped internment in North Africa which was under German control and came back to England. During this time Hugh, Wright's son, was killed in action in France. Wright travelled throughout England as Missionary missioner for CMS stirring up missionary enthusiasm, however bombings often meant he had long detours to his destinations and it proved difficult to find his hosts on several occasions due to the blackout.

In 1941 it became impossible for Wright to return to North Africa due to the war and Wright was offered the living of Templecombe by the Bishop of Bath and Wells with the arrangement that a day a week he would continue working for CMS until 1942. Wright used his bicycle to get around the area. On 5 September 1942 the church was damaged by a bomb along with a number of other houses.

In November 1944 Gordon, Wright's eldest son, was killed.

In 1951 Wright retired from full-time responsibility of Templecombe and moved with his family to North London, temporarily lodging with Rev G T Manley. In 1952 the family moved to Tunbridge Wells to live with Doris, Wright's daughter, and her family. Wright continued with his work for CMS travelling around Kent to speak and preach. On 3 January 1954 he had a haemorrhage whilst travelling to speak at Sandhurst near Hawkhurst.

Wright preached occasionally at St Luke's Tunbridge Wells at the Holy Communion Service and often read the Lessons.

The last time he preached was in October 1955 at St Mary's Lamberhurst, peaching on "In The beginning God", Gen 1:1, "In GOD we live and move and have our being", Acts 17:28 and "Be still and know that I AM GOD", Psalm 46:10

Wright died in 1956, previously telling his wife: "I'm going on a long journey", to which her response was "Well – I'm coming with you". He knew his work was done. Wright is buried in Tunbridge Wells.
