= Belper Congregational Church =

Former church in Derbyshire, England

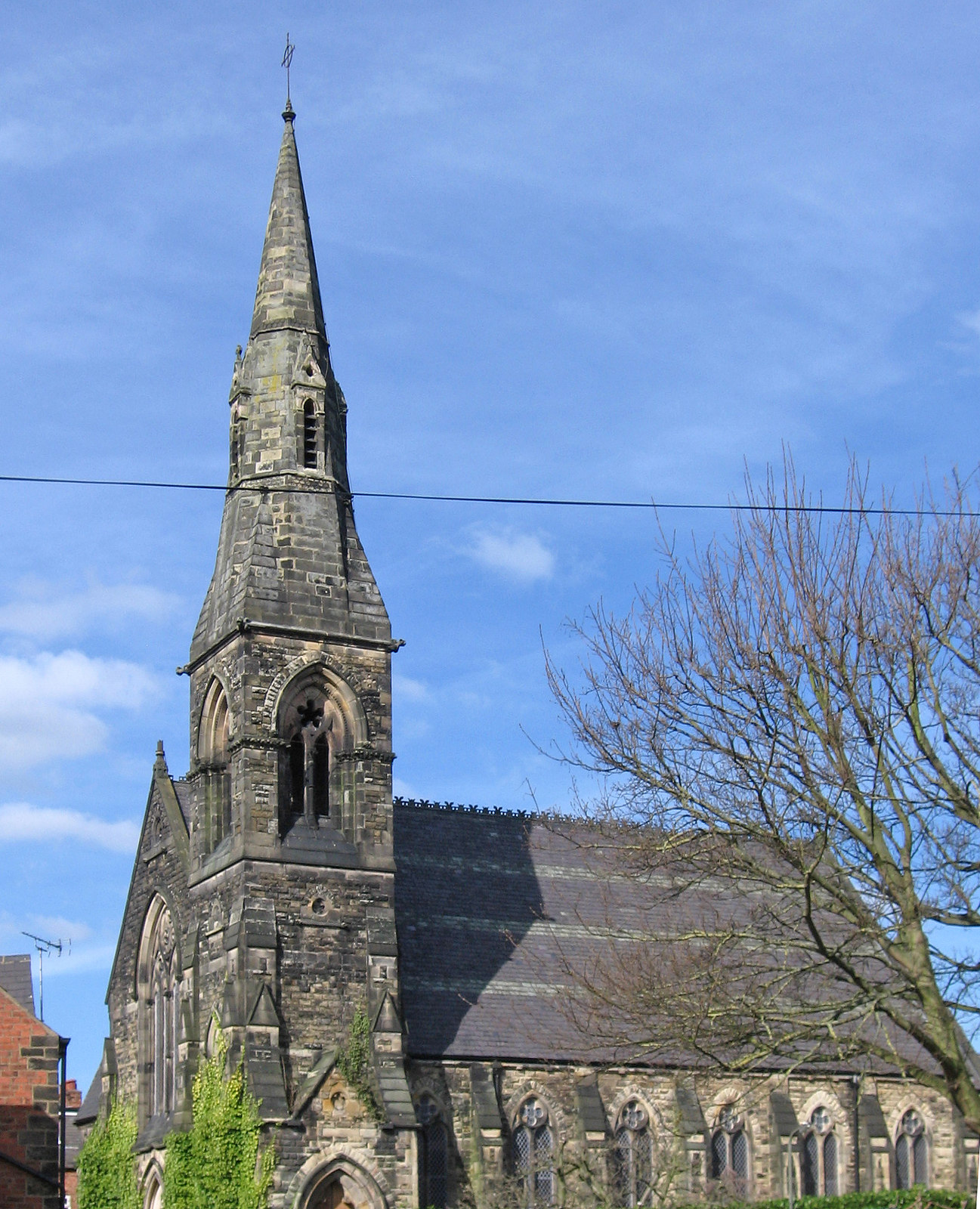
- Belper Congregational Church

- Location within Derbyshire
- 53°01′32.7″N 1°28′48″W
- Location: Belper, Derbyshire
- Country: England
- Denomination: Congregational

Architecture
- Heritage designation: Grade II listed
- Architect: George Woodhouse
- Style: French Gothic
- Completed: 13 November 1872

Specifications
- Length: 84 feet (26 m)
- Width: 40 feet (12 m)
- Height: 40 feet (12 m)

Belper Congregational Church is a Grade-II listed former congregational chapel located on Green Lane in Belper, Derbyshire.

== History ==
It was built to replace an earlier chapel of 1790, which the congregation had outgrown. It was designed by George Woodhouse of Bolton, Architect and built by Mr. Cash of Duffield. It comprised a nave with entrance vestibule and staircase, and a chancel at the east end which contained the organ and choir. On either side of the chancel, vestries were provided. There was a gallery at the west end and provision was made for galleries on each side if later required. The tower at the south-western angle of the building was surmounted by a spire and metal finial. The walls were of stone and both ashlar and dressings were from local quarries. There were sittings for 550 persons. The total cost was about £4,000 (equivalent to £391,100 in 2025). The church opened on 13 November 1872. The church was extended to form a schoolroom in 1899. In the 1980s, the church building became surplus to requirements. The congregation moved into a new smaller building behind and in the late 20th century the 1872 building was converted to housing.

== See also ==
- Listed buildings in Belper
