= Holy Trinity Church, Milford =

Former church in Derbyshire, England

Holy Trhttps://en.wikipedia.org/w/index.php?title=Holy_Trinity_Church,_Milford&action=editinity Church, Milford
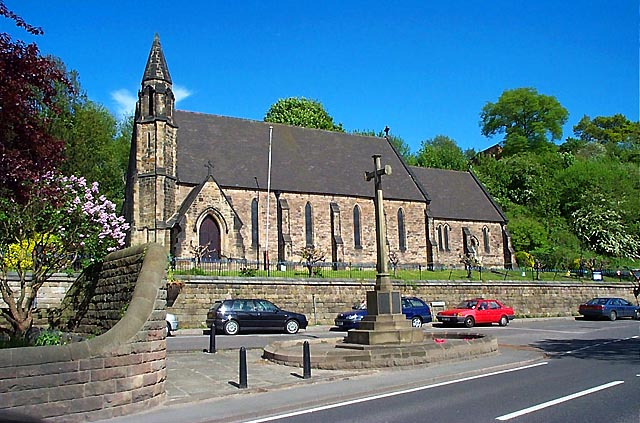
- Holy Trinity Church, Milford

- Location within Derbyshire
- 53°00′14.26″N 1°28′41.69″W
- OS grid reference: SK 35111 45370
- Location: Milford, Derbyshire
- Country: England
- Denomination: Church of England

History
- Dedication: Holy Trinity
- Consecrated: 26 July 1848

Architecture
- Heritage designation: Grade II listed
- Architect: William Bonython Moffatt
- Completed: 1848
- Closed: 2021

Administration
- Province: Canterbury
- Diocese: Derby
- Archdeaconry: Derby
- Deanery: Duffield
- Parish: Milford

Holy Trinity Church, Milford is a former Grade II listed parish church in the Church of England situated in Milford, Derbyshire.

== History ==
The architect was William Bonython Moffatt and the contractor was Mr. Thompson of Derby. The church was consecrated by the Bishop of Lichfield on 26 July 1848. The church was extended in 1909 to the south-east, forming a vestry and church room to the designs of Hunter and Woodhouse of Belper.

== Organ ==
The church obtained a pipe organ in 1905 at a cost of £450 (equivalent to £47,307 in 2025) by Bevington and Sons. This was sold to Australia in 1994 and replaced by an older instrument dating from 1874 by J.M. Grunwell which had previously been in Belper Baptist Church. A specification of the organ can be found on the National Pipe Organ Register.

== Closure ==
The high cost of upkeep of the church led to a decision being made in 2021 to cease using it for services. The final service was held on 26 September of that year.

== See also ==
- Listed buildings in Belper
