= St Peter's Church, Belper =

St Peter’s Church, Belper
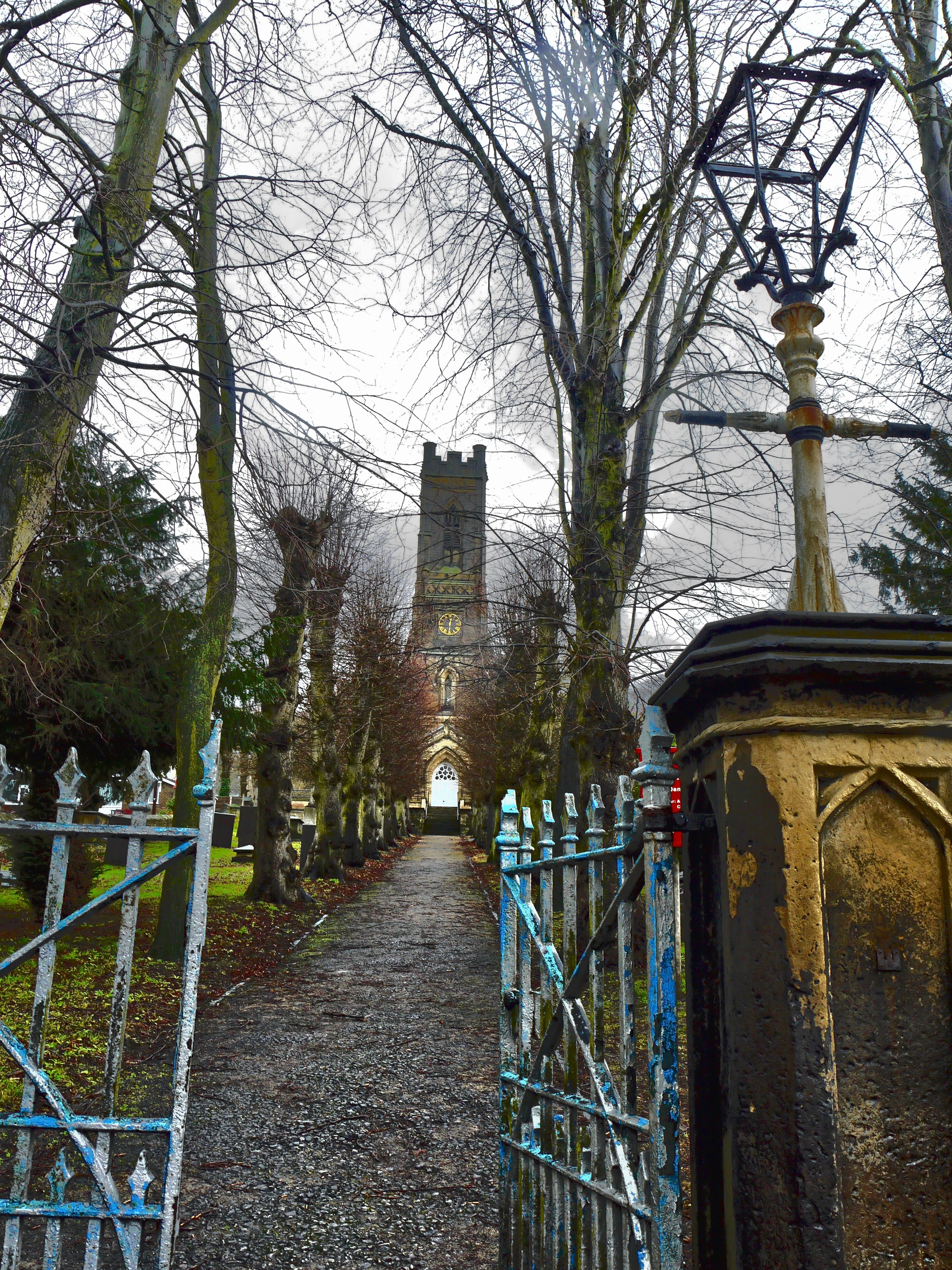
- St Peter’s Church, Belper
- St Peter’s Church, Belper
- 53°01′30.7″N 1°28′44.2″W
- OS grid reference: SK 35081 47674
- Location: Belper, Derbyshire
- Country: England
- Denomination: Church of England

History
- Dedication: St Peter
- Consecrated: 6 September 1824

Architecture
- Heritage designation: Grade II listed
- Architect: Matthew Habershon
- Completed: 1824

Administration
- Province: Province of Canterbury
- Diocese: Diocese of Derby
- Archdeaconry: Derbyshire Peak and Dales
- Deanery: Dove and Derwent
- Parish: Belper

St Peter's Church, Belper is a Grade II listed parish church in the Church of England in Belper, Derbyshire.

== History ==
The church was built to the designs of the architect Matthew Habershon. The designs were exhibited at the Royal Academy of Arts of 1824. The church was consecrated by the Bishop of Lichfield and Coventry, Rt. Revd. Henry Ryder on 6 September 1824.

== Parish status ==
The church is in a joint parish with:

- St Swithun's Church, Belper
- St Mark's Church, Openwoodgate, Belper

== Memorials ==
- George Brettle, 1835 by Sir Richard Westmacott.

== Organ ==
The first organ dating from around 1754 was installed second hand from the old chapel of St John. It was sold to St Luke's Church, Heage when a new organ was provided by William Holt of Bradford at a cost of 300 guineas (equivalent to £33,500 in 2025), and was opened on 22 December 1853. This was rebuilt in 1873 by Radcliffe & Sagar of Woodhouse Lane in Leeds enlarging it to become an instrument of 3-manual & pedals. In 1902 J.H. Adkins of Derby overhauled the organ and made some tonal changes. In 1978/9 some further work was done by Edmund Stow. A specification of the current organ can be found on the National Pipe Organ Register.

=== Organists ===
- Isaac Hanson ca. 1860
- W. A. Shaw ???? - 1871 (afterwards organist of Salem Chapel, Belper)
- Thomas Barker Mellor 1871 - 1877
- Walter Wardle Windle F.C.O. 1882 - 1930 (formerly organist of Brimington)
- Reginald G. Harvey 1930 - ????

== Bells ==
The church tower contains 8 bells all cast in 1925 by John Taylor of Loughborough.

== Clock ==
A new clock by John Moore & Sons was installed in the tower in 1864.

== See also ==
- Listed buildings in Belper
