= Belper Baptist Church =

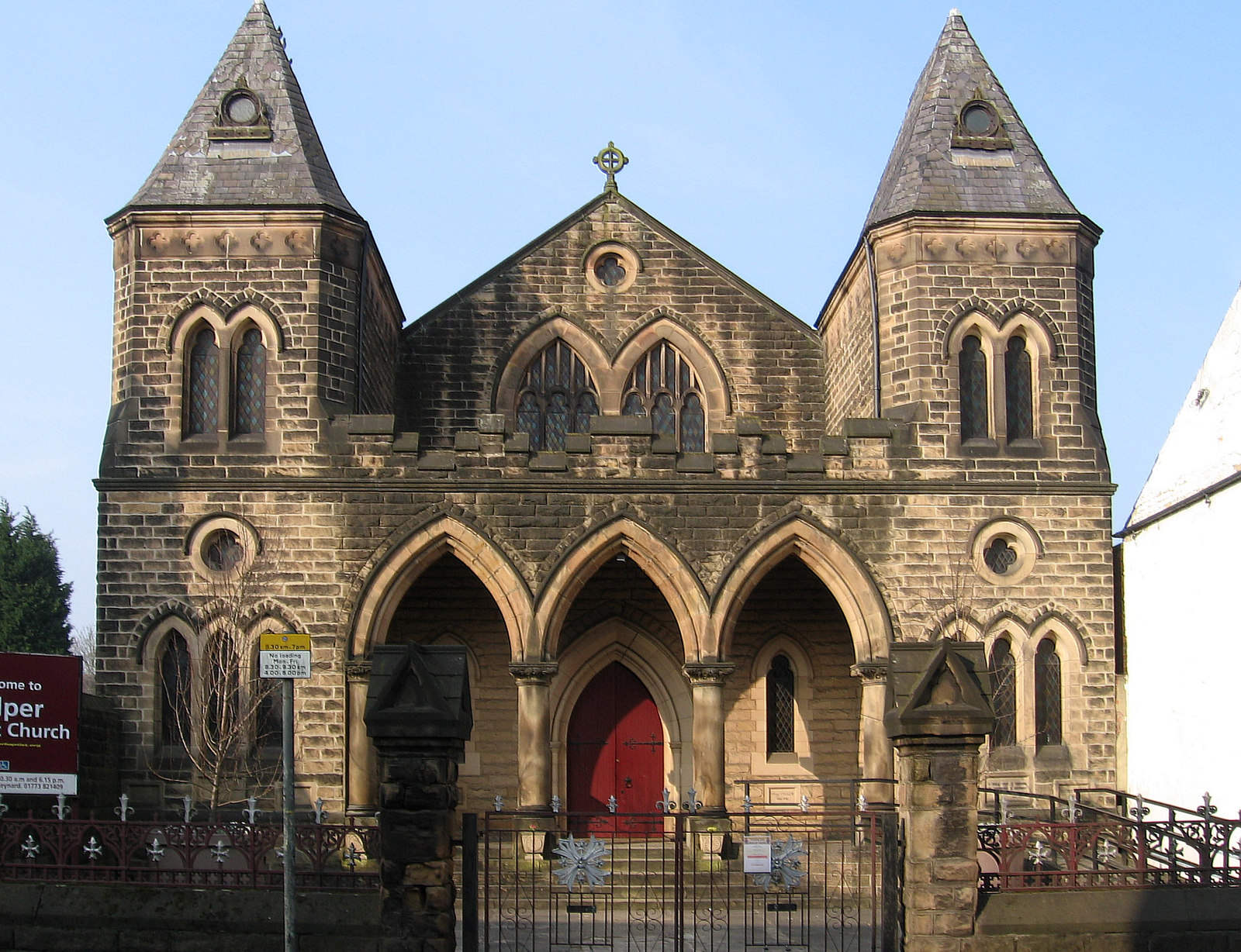
- Belper Baptist Church

- Location within Derbyshire
- 53°01′32″N 1°29′8″W
- Location: Belper, Derbyshire
- Country: England
- Denomination: Baptist
- Website: belperbaptist.org

Architecture
- Architect: S.R. Bakewell of Belper
- Groundbreaking: 7 August 1893
- Completed: 5 August 1894; 131 years ago

Belper Baptist Church is a Baptist Chapel on Bridge Street in Belper, Derbyshire, England.

== History ==
The Baptist presence in Belper was formed from a congregation at Duffield in 1817. A chapel was built and was in use by 1819.

It was built to replace an earlier chapel which the congregation had outgrown. Plans were developed in 1877. The land in Bridge Street was purchased for £518 and this debt was paid off by 1885, when fund-raising for construction started.

By Easter 1893, the congregation had raised enough money to lay the foundation stone of the new building. The foundation stone was laid on 7 August 1893.

It was designed by S. R. Bakewell C.E. of Belper, and the contractor was A. Hingley of Duffield. It was constructed with Darley Dale stone, relieved with cornices, strings and arches of dressed stone. The total cost was around £2,700.

== Organ ==
The church had a pipe organ by J.M. Grunwell dating from 1874 which was originally in the home of Thomas Barker Mellor. It was moved into the Baptist Church in 1901. A specification of the organ can be found on the National Pipe Organ Register. It was removed in 1994 and transferred to Holy Trinity Church, Milford.
