= Milford Tunnel =

Railway tunnel in Derbyshire, England

Coordinates: 53.00121°N 1.48737°W

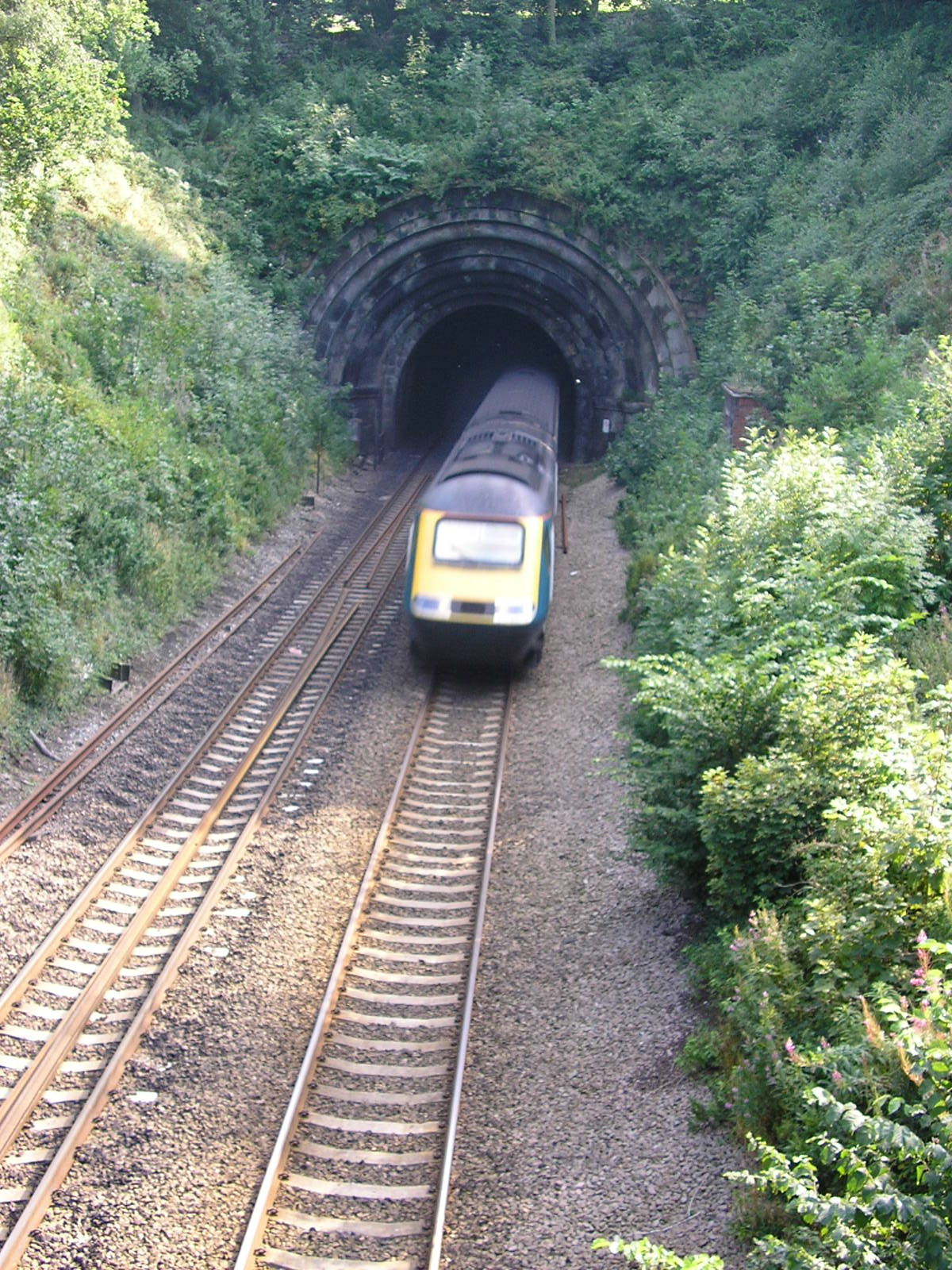
North portal of Milford Tunnel

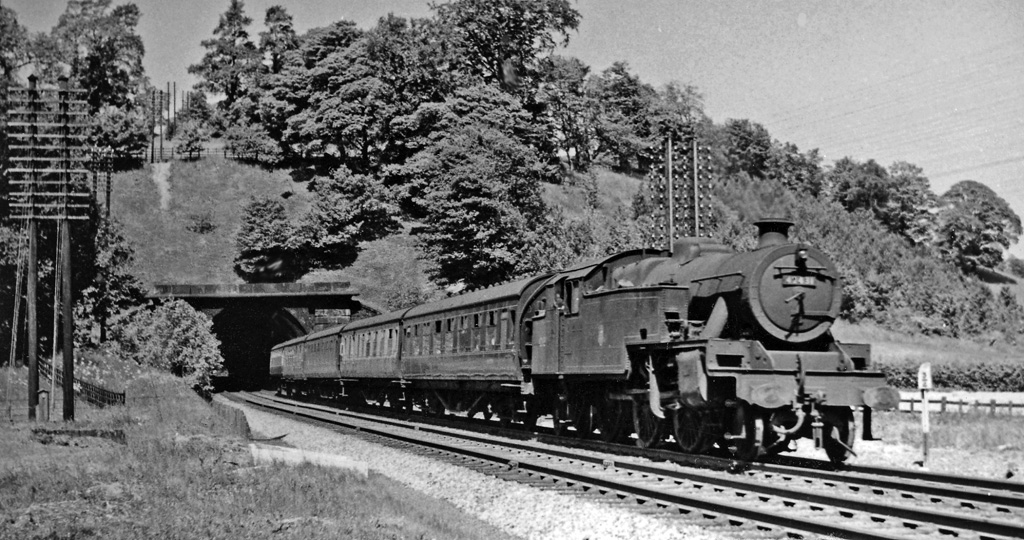
Milford Tunnel south portal in 1957

Milford Tunnel is a double-track railway tunnel on the Midland Main Line in Derbyshire which runs under a hill called the Chevin between Duffield and Belper. It was built in 1840 by the Stephensons for the North Midland Railway. At 856 yards (783 m) long, Milford Tunnel was the second-longest tunnel on the North Midland Railway when it was built.

The west side of the Derwent valley has a number of gritstone outcrops, one being Burley Hill to the south of Duffield, another being Castle Hill in Duffield itself. The valley here however was too narrow, and already occupied by the village of Milford from which the tunnel gets its name, and one of Jedediah Strutt's cotton mills. The name Chevin has Celtic origins, but the hill is often called Firestone Hill, for the spot on which the beacon fires were lighted to rouse the country when peril of invasion or other dangers were imminent.

== Description ==
The North Midland built more ornate portals at the northern ends of its tunnels, while the southern ends were relatively plain. In this case the northern portal is a Saxon-inspired arch, surrounded by seven huge concentric semi-circular rings of stone. The portal is set into a wall of rubble masonry, which has become so overgrown as to be no longer visible. The southern portal is to the standard North Midland design. Both portals are grade II listed, being part of the Derwent Valley Mills World Heritage Site.

== History ==
The Milford Contract for building the tunnel was let by the North Midland Railway in about October 1837 and completed by June 1840, in time for the opening of the line. The engineers for the route were George and Robert Stephenson, assisted by Frederick Swanwick. The winning contractor was David McIntosh who tendered £93,122 (equivalent to £10,688,000 in 2023) Historic England has suggested that the architect Francis Thompson may have been involved with the design of the tunnel portal, which received more special aesthetic treatment because it faced land owned by the Strutt family, who were in negotiations by the railway, and it could be readily appreciated by standing on an adjacent road bridge.

No contract drawings of Milford Tunnel North Portal have been found. Milford Tunnel is included in the drawings for the Milford contract, but this does not show the North Portal as executed. Instead it shows the standard North Midland Railway design for tunnel portals, without specifying the north or south portal. This design was executed at the tunnel's south portal, suggesting that at the time the contract was let, both portals were intended to be the same, and that the northern structure's design as built was a late addition to the contract.

When the Midland Railway upgraded the line to four tracks south of the tunnel, a signal box was installed to control the junction of the goods and passenger lines, also providing warning distant signals at the north entrance.

== Tower ==
At the summit of the hill there was built a substantial tower, which still exists, the purpose of which has been a matter for speculation. It has generally been thought that it was to check the alignment of the tunnel construction, and was equipped with a rotating telescope. It has been pointed out that such a facility appeared with no other tunnel of the time and there is an alternative theory that it was concerned with supervising the passage of trains through the tunnel. In effect an early experiment with a form of block working, instead of the time interval system commonly used.

== See also ==
- Grade II* listed buildings in Amber Valley
- Listed buildings in Belper

== Sources ==
- Pixton, B., (2000) North Midland: Portrait of a Famous Route, Cheltenham: Runpast Publishing
- Naylor, P. (Ed) (2000) An Illustrated History of Belper and its Environs Belper: M.G.Morris
