= Babington Hospital =

- Derbyshire Community Health Services NHS Foundation Trust
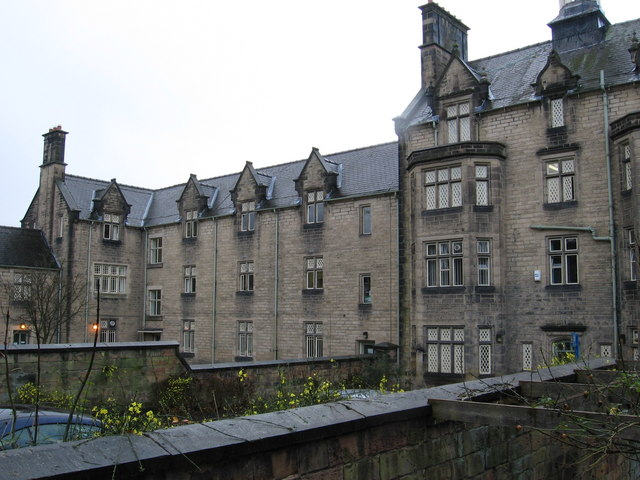
- Babington Hospital

- Location in Derbyshire

Geography
- Location: Derby Road, Belper, Derbyshire, England
- Coordinates: 53.0183°N 1.4891°W

Organisation
- Care system: NHS
- Type: General

History
- Founded: 1840

Links
- Website: www.dchs.nhs.uk

Babington Hospital is a NHS Hospital in Belper, Derbyshire, England. It is managed by the Derbyshire Community Health Services NHS Foundation Trust.

== History ==
The site chosen for the facility was known as Babington Meadow. The oldest part of the facility, the eastern courtyard, which was designed by Sir George Gilbert Scott and William Bonython Moffatt in the Jacobean style, was opened as the Belper Poor Law Union Workhouse in September 1840. A main entrance lodge to the eastern courtyard was built facing on the Derby Road at around the same time. A large infirmary was added on the western part of the site in 1889. The facility became the Babington House Public Assistance Institution in 1930 and it joined the National Health Service as Babington Hospital in 1948. In June 2018 the NHS Southern Derbyshire Clinical Commissioning Group announced plans to transfer services to a modern facility in Derwent Street.

== See also ==
- Listed buildings in Belper
