= Matthew Habershon =

English architect

Matthew Habershon (1789–1852) was an English architect and writer on architectural and religious subjects.

== Biography ==
Habershon was born in Rotherham, Yorkshire, on 2 December 1789; his father, also named Matthew Habershon, was the manager of an iron foundry. In 1806 he was articled to the architect William Atkinson, with whom he remained for some years as assistant. He was an occasional exhibitor at the Royal Academy between 1807 and 1827.

He designed the churches of St Peter, Belper (1824), St John the Baptist, Winster (1840-42, retaining the tower of the previous church) and Christ Church, Derby (1839-40, built in memory of Bishop Ryder) all in Derbyshire, and St Thomas, Kimberworth (1842) in Yorkshire.

At Derby he erected the town hall, which later burnt down, the county courts, and the market. Among the many private houses he designed was Hadzor House, near Droitwich, Worcestershire, for J. Howard Galton (1827).

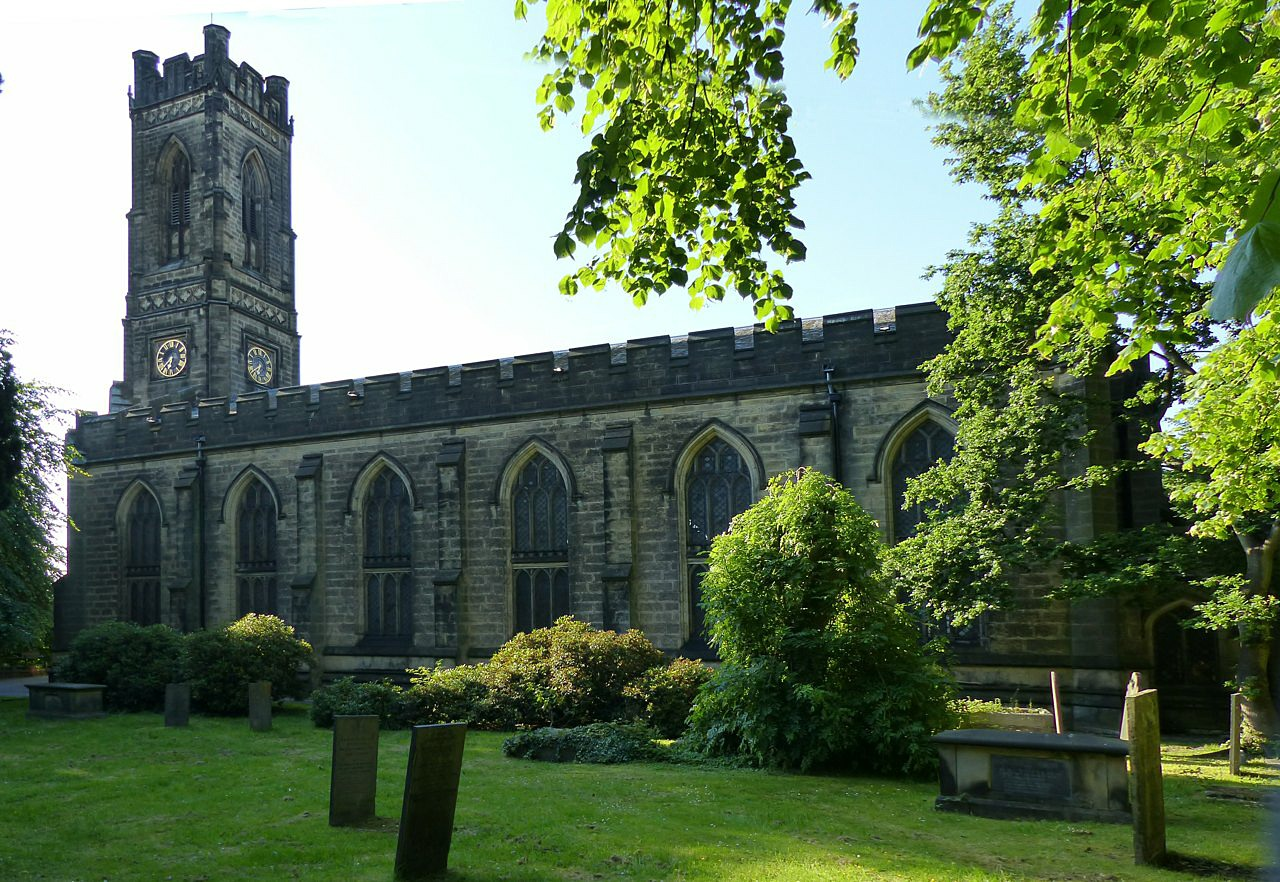
Habershon's church of St Peter, Belper.

In 1842 he visited Jerusalem on behalf of the London Society for Promoting Christianity among the Jews, following the dismissal of the architect James Wood Johns, whose design for an Anglican church in the city had been rejected by the Ottoman authorities. Habershon's plan for the site took the more diplomatically acceptable form of a chapel attached to a consulate. His building, completed in 1849, became known as Christ Church, Jerusalem.

On his way home from Jerusalem in 1843, Habershon met with King Frederick William IV of Prussia, who was involved in the establishment of the Anglican-German Bishopric in Jerusalem. The following year the king conferred on Habershon the great gold medal for science and literature in appreciation of his book on The Ancient Half-Timbered Houses of England (1836).

In 1843, Habershon was aligned with Open Brethren in Hackney, London. There he met the naturalist and fellow member of the Brethren Philip Henry Gosse, who was profoundly influenced by his historicist premillenialist work, Dissertation on the Prophetic Scriptures (second edition, 1840).

Habershon died in London in 1852, and was buried in Abney Park Cemetery. Two of his sons, William Gillbee and Edward, were also architects.

== Writings ==
- A Dissertation on the Prophetic Scriptures, chiefly those of a chronological character, showing their aspect on the present times, and on the destinies of the Jewish Nation (1834).
- A Guide to the Study of Chronological Prophecy, selected and abridged from … a Dissertation on the Prophetic Scriptures
- The Ancient half-timbered Houses of England (1836).
- Premillennial Hymns (1836).
- 'An Epitome of Prophetic Truth, containing a brief Outline of … Prominent Subjects of Prophecy (1841).
- An Historical Exposition of the Prophecies of the Revelation of St. John, showing their connection with those of Daniel, and of the Old Testament in general, particularly in their aspect on the present times.
- Two remarkable Signs of the Times, viewed in connexion with Prophecy. First, Reasons for believing the Death of the Duke of Orleans to be the first Thunder; second, An Account of the West London Synagogue of British Jews.… Forming an Appendix to the third edition of "A Dissertation on the Prophetic Scriptures (1842).
- The Shadows of the Evening; or the Signs of the Lord's speedy Return (1845).

He also wrote a memoir of Charles Daubuz, prefixed to the latter's Symbolical Dictionary (1842).
