= Belper North Mill =

Cotton mill in Belper, Derbyshire, England

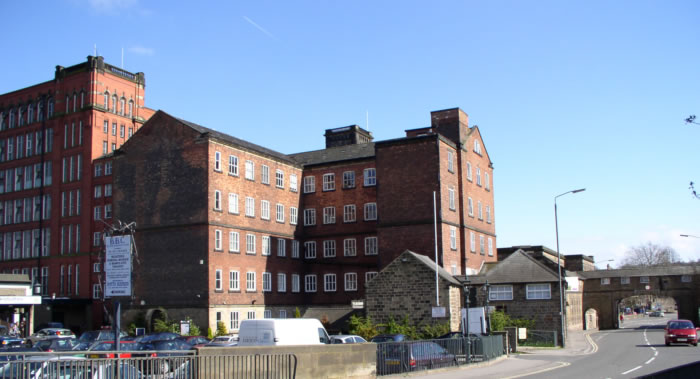
- The mill in 2006

- Location in Derbyshire

Cotton
- Structural system: Industrialised iron framed 'fire-proof' brick
- Location: Belper, Derbyshire, England
- Client: William Strutt
- Coordinates: 53.0282°N 1.4869°W

Construction
- Built: 1804
- Floor count: 6
- Floor area: 127 feet (39 m) long by 31 feet (9.4 m) wide
- Floor usage: In 1804: Ground Floor:Unloading; 1st: Spinning; 2nd: Spinning; 3rd: Carding; 4th: Carding; 5th: Reeling; attic: Schoolroom

Design team
- Awards and prizes and listings: World Heritage Site

Water Power
- Wheels: 1
- Diameter / width of water wheel: 18 feet (5.5 m) / 23 feet (7.0 m)

Equipment
- Carding Equipment: 136
- Ring Frames path: 80 spinning frames with 4236 spindles
- Other Equipment: 1812: 16 draw frames; 4 stretching frames; Plus reeling, doubling and twisting frames

Belper North Mill, also known as Strutt's North Mill in Belper, is one of the Derwent Valley Mills, given UNESCO World Heritage Status in 2001.

The mill is sited in Belper, a town in Derbyshire, England, roughly halfway between Derby and Matlock.

The original North Mill, completed in 1786 by Jedediah Strutt, was destroyed by fire in 1803. Its replacement was built in 1804 by his son, William Strutt, on the foundations of the old mill and is one of the oldest surviving examples of an iron-framed 'fire-proof' building in the world.

In 2015 a report by Amber Valley Borough Council said the North Mill (and the Grade II listed East Mill) were in need of repair as they had suffered "significant damage", and the council was said to be considering a compulsory purchase order.

== Construction ==
The iron-framed mill is 127 feet (39 m) long by 31 feet (9.4 m) wide, 63 feet (19 m) high. It had two 41.5 by 34 feet (12.6 by 10.4 m) wings.

Cotton mills were prone to fire as cotton dust ignites easily and the resulting fire burns through ceiling and floor timbers. This had happened to the earlier mill. In an attempt to prevent this happening experiments were made to construct a fireproof mill. The wooden beams supporting the floor timbers were replaced with beams of cast iron, (steel was not available till after 1860) and between them were low vaults made of brick with a 9 feet (2.7 m) span. Above this rubble was used to level the floor which was made of brick. The floor arches over the wheel pit were of a hollow clay construction.

The beams were cast in a "turtle back profile" to give the required strength, at minimum weight. They were supported by cast iron columns, erected on top of each other. The lateral thrust of the brick arches was resisted by concealed wrought iron ties between the column tops. The building was 15 bays wide, and the wings six bays wide.

The mill is one of the first iron framed buildings. The technology is the precursor of the steel frames used in high rise buildings. The roof was made of slate and had internal gutters.

== The waterwheel ==
A breast-shot waterwheel, 18 by 23 feet (5.5 by 7.0 m) wide, was built by Thomas Hewes. It was a suspension wheel with the power taken off at the edge by a spur wheel, making it lighter than a clasp wheel. The power was transmitted to the machines by a vertical shaft, geared to horizontal shafts on each floor. Leather belts were used to connect the shafts to individual machines.

== Processes ==
Each of the mill's five floors housed different stages of the cotton spinning processes.

Raw cotton bales were unloaded from carts at the ground floor loading bay. The opening and cleaning machines broke the bales down and prepared the cotton into 'lap' form which was taken to the third and fourth floor carding rooms, housing three rows of carding engines, over 130. Carding machines disentangle the cotton fibres to produce a long continuous 'sliver'. Sixteen drawing frames, sometimes called lantern frames, straightened the fibres and pulled the 'slivers' into 'rovings' putting in a slight twist so they were ready for spinning. The rovings were coiled into large cans which were taken to the first and second floor.

Both the first and second floors originally housed thirty-four Arkwright water frames which spun 4236 ends simultaneously. This meant that 4236 rovings were continuously twisted together to become threads that were collected on small bobbins. Later mule spinning machines were introduced to produce finer thread types which were in demand. The bobbins were sent to the fifth floor. On the fifth floor, reeling frames wound the spun thread into 'skeins' ready for dyeing at a factory in Milford. Doubling frames twisted two or more single spun thread together to make thicker and stronger thread. The amount of twist imparted determined the thread's properties.

The attic was later used as a schoolroom.

== Machinery ==
Machinery contained in this mill:-

- 80 spinning frames with 4236 spindles each
- 136 carding engines
- 16 draw frames
- 4 stretching frames
- Plus reeling, doubling and twisting frames

== Hydro-electric plant ==
In 1998 a hydro-electric power generator was installed in the mill, producing 350 kW of power. This consists of 2 x 175 kW grid-connected low head Gilkes water turbine sets. It was installed by Derwent Hydroelectric Power Limited.

== See also ==
- Grade I listed buildings in Derbyshire
- Listed buildings in Belper
