= Christ Church, Derby =

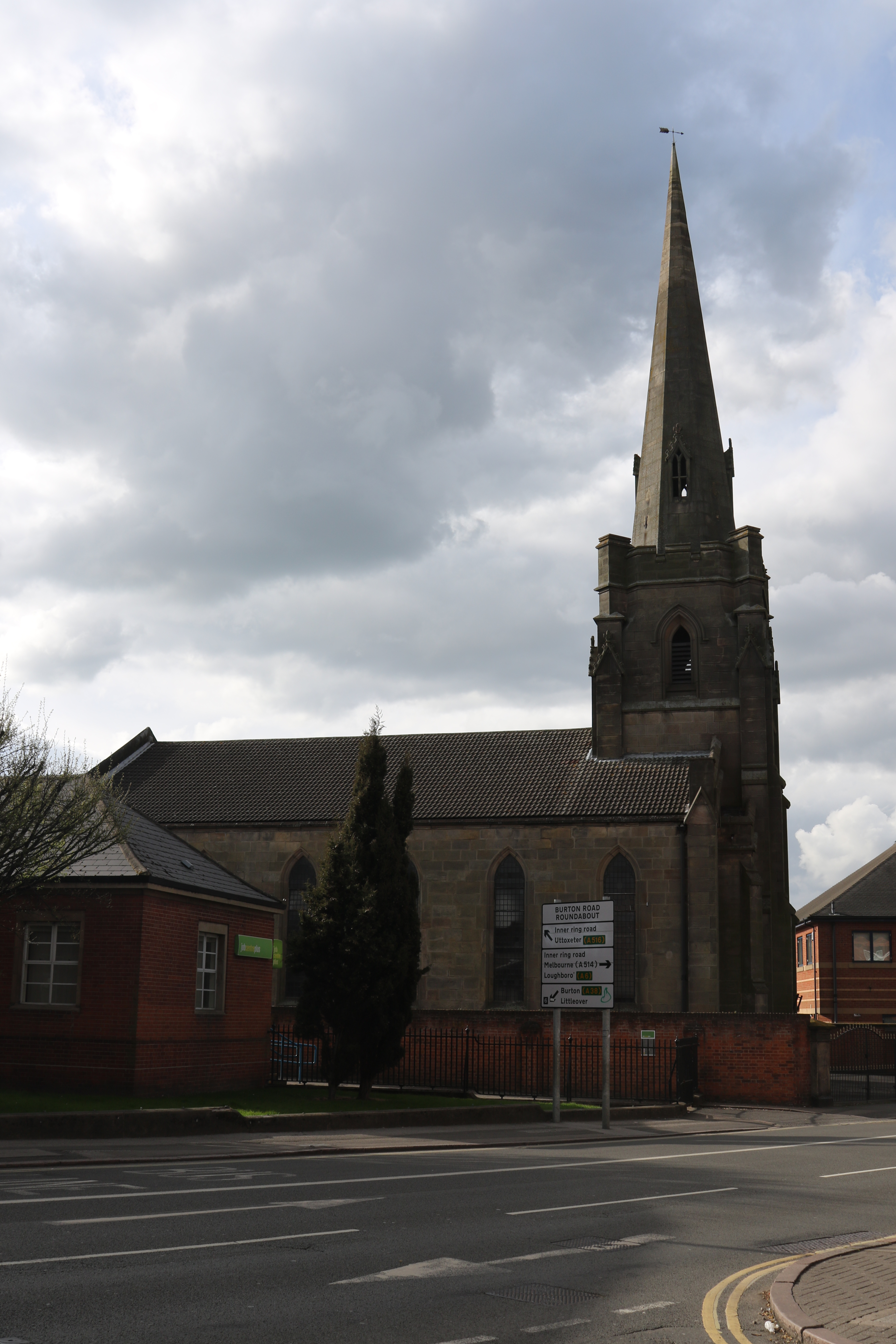
- Christ Church, Derby
- Christ Church, Derby
- 52°55′0.4″N 1°28′42.3″W
- Location: Derby
- Country: England
- Denomination: Serbian Orthodox
- Previous denomination: Church of England

History
- Dedication: Christ Church
- Consecrated: 16 January 1844

Architecture
- Heritage designation: Grade II listed
- Architect: Matthew Habershon
- Groundbreaking: 12 July 1838
- Completed: 1842
- Closed: 1976

Christ Church, Derby is a Grade II listed former Church of England parish church in Derby now the Serbian Orthodox Church of the Apostles St Peter and St Paul.

== History ==
The foundation stone for the new church was laid on 10 July 1838 by Sir William Evans, 1st Baronet. The new church was built to the designs of Matthew Habershon and consecrated on 16 January 1844 by the Bishop of Lichfield. The chancel was added in 1865 and the church re-opened on 16 February 1865 The architects were Giles and Brookhouse.

The church was renovated in 1877 when the pews were replaced by stalls, and the church was redecorated, under the supervision of F J Robinson of Derby, architect.

In 1972, the parish merged with St.Peters, and the building was closed in 1976 and disposed of in 1977. It was sold to the Serbian Orthodox Church.

== Organ ==
The church contains in a now derelict state an organ by Francis Booth dating from 1855. A specification of the organ can be found on the National Pipe Organ Register.

=== Organists ===
- Tom G. Taylor ca. 1883

Martyn Warsop 1973
