= Frederick Swanwick =

English engineer (1810–1885)

Frederick Swanwick (1810–1885) was an English civil engineer who assisted George and Robert Stephenson. He was responsible for much of the work on railways in the North and Midlands of England, particularly the Whitby and Pickering Railway and the North Midland Railway.

== Early life ==
He was born on 1 October 1810 in Chester to Joseph Swanwick and Hannah nee Wicksteed, one of a large family.

He was first educated at a school run by his maiden aunts, Mary and Martha Wicksteed, followed by tutelage of the Rev. William Bakewell, the Unitarian minister at Chester. At the age of around twelve he went to live with the Rev. Dr. Hutton in Leeds, since though his elder brothers had been sent to a public school, his large family was proving expensive to educate. In common with such schools of the time, the curriculum of the school seems to have consisted of Latin, Greek, French, and some elementary mathematics. It did not include science or engineering as unbefitting for one of his class.

In 1826, at the age of seventeen, he enrolled at the University of Edinburgh. He discarded his classical studies in favour of mathematics, natural philosophy and geology. Returning home in 1827, he continued his study of mathematics. He had a strong interest in civil engineering, following the work of a cousin on his mother's side, Thomas Wicksteed, engineer of the East London Waterworks Company. It was at this time that the Grosvenor Bridge was being built at Chester across the River Dee. Frederick's father knew the contractor James Trubshaw personally and obtained permission for Frederick to assist with the work. Following this, an uncle introduced him to George Stephenson.

== Career ==
Aged nineteen, he was indentured to George Stephenson for "four years and eight months from 5 October 1829 in the occupation or business of a civil engineer," and went to live with him at his home with the other apprentices. Within a year he was made private secretary, succeeding Daniel Gooch and continued in that position until Stephenson moved to Ashby-de-la-Zouch.

He assisted Stephenson in building the Liverpool and Manchester Railway and drove one of the engines, “Arrow,” which drew the first passenger train. This was followed by the construction of the Leicester and Swannington Railway in 1832. Following this, Stephenson delegated to him the entire work of building the horse-drawn Whitby and Pickering Railway, which opened on 26 May 1836.

In 1835, George Stephenson received the commission to build the North Midland Railway from Derby to Leeds. He and Swanwick travelled the route on the 5th and 6 August, and the latter carried out further inspections with his assistants, meeting George Stephenson at Sheffield to discuss their future plans. Concurrently with this he was working on the York and North Midland Railway and the Sheffield and Rotherham Railway. Confidence in his capability was such that in 1836 he was present at the House of Lords to give evidence to the Committee about these three lines, as well as on the proposed Birmingham and Derby Junction Railway. The accuracy of his presentations at a time when the slightest error could cause rejection of a bill justified the confidence Stephenson placed on him.

The Act for the North Midland Railway was obtained in 1836, and Frederick Swanwick became acting engineer. Again, Stephenson, who was wishing to concentrate in exploiting the coal in Leicestershire and in Clay Cross, delegated to him the responsibility for almost the entire work involved in its construction. This entailed laying out of the line, preparing the plans and specifications of all the work, and organising and superintending much of the work The construction of the 72 mile line took four years to accomplish, practically its whole length being on embankments and viaducts or through cuttings and tunnels. The line was opened in 1840.

He continued as resident engineer of the North Midland Railway until 1844, and played a leading role in the formation of Midland Railway taking the various bills through Parliament, and then supervising the work on new lines and reconstruction of existing ones, among them the Nottingham and Mansfield, Nottingham and Lincoln, the Erewash Valley Line and the Mansfield and Pinxton.

== Personal life ==
Though tremendously busy, he set great store by his family life. In 1836 he lived at Norton Lees on the outskirts of Sheffield but in 1837 he moved to Whittington, and invited his father, mother and sister to join him, with his maiden aunts, the Misses Wicksteed, to live nearby.

On 21 July 1840 he married Elizabeth Drayton, fourth child of Mr. William Drayton, of Leicester, with whom he had a son and a daughter.

From about 1850 he began to prepare for retirement and took on no new professional work. He had for some time been a supporter of benevolent schemes such as the Mechanics' Institute, various schools in Chesterfield and Whittington, and the Chesterfield and North Derbyshire Hospital. The extended leisure allowed him to give them more attention.

In 1857 he intervened in a dispute between the Edinburgh and Glasgow Railway Company, in which he had shares, and the Stirling and Dunfermline Railway Company. Though many of the others had sold their shares in disgust, he secured an agreement between the two companies.

In 1869 he became a Justice of the Peace for the county of Derby and was active in the Liberal Party, resisting invitations to stand for Parliament. He took an increasing interest in education, visiting schools around the country to study them. Whittington was expanding rapidly with industry and had become three separate villages: Old Whittington, New Whittington and Whittington Moor. Swanwick gave generously of his time and money to provide education for the increasing population, in time building up to a school in each of the three villages.

In the autumn of 1884, signs of failing health began to show themselves. Even after stays, first in Gloucestershire, and then Bournemouth, it had not improved a year later. Finally on 15 November 1885 he died, and was buried at Chesterfield cemetery six days later.

== Sources ==
Smith, J.F., (1888) Frederick Swanwick: A Sketch, Printed for private circulation
