= Listed buildings in Shrewsbury (outer areas) =

Shrewsbury is a civil parish in Shropshire, England. It contains nearly 800 listed buildings that are recorded in the National Heritage List for England. Of these, 14 are listed at Grade I, the highest of the three grades, 71 are at Grade II*, the middle grade, and the others are at Grade II, the lowest grade.

Shrewsbury is the county town of Shropshire, it is a market town and the commercial centre for the county and for mid-Wales. It stands on the River Severn, and its centre is almost surrounded by a large curve in the river. The oldest substantial surviving buildings in the town are Shrewsbury Castle and Shrewsbury Abbey, together with a number of churches and the town walls. The town flourished commercially during the 13th century, mainly from the wool trade, and a number of friaries were founded. Two major bridges were built, the Welsh Bridge at the north of the town, linking its centre with the suburb of Frankwell, and the English Bridge to the east, linking with the abbey and the suburb of Abbey Foregate. Following a decline in fortune during the 15th century, trade revived during the later 16th century, mainly from Welsh cloth, and impressive houses were built, most of which were timber framed. There was particular growth during the 18th century, when more impressive properties and public buildings were constructed, now in brick. A public park was created on the site of a former quarry, and named appropriately The Quarry. There was little heavy industry in the town, but at the end of the 18th century Ditherington Flax Mill was built, the first fully iron-framed building in the world. At the same time, the Shrewsbury Canal was opened, and the railway arrived in the town in 1848. There was further development during the 19th century in the town centre and the suburbs. Shrewsbury School, originally a grammar school in the town centre, moved to a new site south of the river in 1882, and has become an independent school. During the 20th century there has been continuing development in and around the town.

Due to the large number of listed buildings, they have been divided into three lists, based on geographical areas. The central area of the town is almost surrounded by the river, and this has been split into two lists, divided by the roads running from the southwest to the northeast, named respectively St John's Hill, Shoplatch, Pride Hill, Castle Street, Castle Gates, and Castle Foregate. This list contains the listed buildings in the areas outside the central area. Most of these are houses and associated structures, public houses and hotels, churches, shops and offices. The most important non-industrial buildings are Shrewsbury Abbey and a pulpit from the former refectory of the abbey. Both of these are in the suburb of Abbey Foregate, to the west of the river, which includes many other listed buildings, mainly domestic. To the south of the river is Shrewsbury School, which is listed together with its chapels and other associated buildings. To the north of the river is Ditherington Flax Mill, six of its buildings being listed, three of them at Grade I, and four bridges crossing the river are also listed.

== Key ==
Grade	Criteria
I	Buildings of exceptional interest, sometimes considered to be internationally important
II*	Particularly important buildings of more than special interest
II	Buildings of national importance and special interest

== Buildings ==
Name and location	Photograph	Date	Notes	Grade
Shrewsbury Abbey; 52.70762°N 2.74373°W		Late 11th to early 12th century	The abbey church was restored in 1861–63 by Samuel Pountney Smith and more extensively by John Loughborough Pearson in 1886–87. The church is built in red sandstone, and consists of a nave with a clerestory, three aisles, north and south transepts and chapels, a chancel, and a west tower. The tower has three stages with a west doorway and a seven-light west window, angle pilasters with niches and statues, and an embattled parapet.	I
St Giles' Church; 52.70205°N 2.73068°W		12th century	The church has been altered and extended through the centuries, including a restoration by S. Pountney Smith in 1860. It is built in sandstone with a tile roof, and consists of a nave, a north aisle, a north chapel, a south transept, a chancel, and northeast vestries. In the west gable is a bellcote surmounting a buttress containing and flanked by lancet windows. The earliest surviving material is in the south wall, including the doorway.	II*
Former Church of St John; 52.68965°N 2.73732°W	—	13th century	A chapel later reduced in size, it is now redundant. The chapel is in sandstone with some brick, and has a tile roof. It is in a single cell, and most of the windows are lancets, with a three-stepped lancet at the east end, and a round-headed window in the west wall. Inside are traces of a wall painting.	II*
Remains of Abbey Guest House; 52.70702°N 2.74494°W		Late 13th century	The former guest house or gate house of the abbey is in red sandstone with extensions in brick, and it has a tile roof. There are two storeys and three bays, with two gable walls and part of side walls of original structure surviving. Part has been rebuilt to serve other purposes. Each gable wall contains the remains of a chamfered arched window.	II*
Refectory pulpit 52.70713°N 2.74359°W		Early 14th century	The pulpit surviving from the abbey refectory is in Grinshill sandstone. It has a hexagonal plan, with three sides corbelled out and open with lancet windows. Below each lancet are two crocketed ogee arches containing statues. The interior is vaulted.	I
18–21 Abbey Foregate; 52.70760°N 2.74489°W		15th century	Originally two hall houses, later used for other purposes, they are timber framed with cruck construction, and have been refaced in brick. They have tile roofs, one storey with attics, and four bays, the left bay being a gabled cross-wing. In the ground floor are shop fronts, and the right three bays contain gabled dormers. Inside are four massive cruck trusses.	II
111 and 112 Frankwell; 52.71117°N 2.75970°W	—	Early 15th century (probable)	A pair of timber framed shops with a tile roof. They have two storeys and attics, and consist of a two-bay main range and a two-bay gabled cross-wing to the left, with a passage between them. Each part has a shop front in the ground floor, and the upper storey is slightly jettied with moulded brackets. The main range has casement windows in the upper floor, and two gabled dormers, and the cross-wing contains mullioned windows in the upper floor and in the attic.	II
St Mary Magdalene's Church, Battlefield; 52.75070°N 2.72366°W		Early 15th century (probable)	The church was restored in 1860–62 by S. Pountney Smith and is now redundant. It is built in limestone with Welsh slate roofs, and consists of a nave, a south aisle, a chancel, and a west tower. The tower has two stages, a stair turret to the south, a quatrefoil frieze, and an embattled parapet with corner pinnacles. The east window has five lights and is in Perpendicular style.	II*
92 Frankwell; 52.71191°N 2.76047°W	—	15th century (possible)	The house has been considerably rebuilt. It is timber framed with cruck construction, it has been clad in brick, and has a Welsh slate roof. There are two low storeys and two bays. In the ground floor is a round-headed doorway to the right and a sash window on the left. In the upper floor are two horizontally-sliding sash windows. In the left gable end is an exposed cruck truss.	II
19–22 Coton Hill; 52.71563°N 2.75354°W	—	Early 16th century	A row of four houses, later combined into two, they are timber framed with some brick cladding and with tile roofs. There are two storeys, and No. 19 forms a cross-range at the south end. There are two doorways with simple hoods on brackets. The windows are casements, some with transoms, and those in the upper floor slightly corbelled out.	II
165, 166 and 167 Frankwell; 52.71084°N 2.75836°W	—	Early 16th century	A row of shops that are timber framed, partly encased in brick and roughcast, and with a tile roof. They consist of three stepped parallel gabled ranges, with two storeys and a basement. Features include gables with weatherboards, oriel windows, and balustraded studs.	II
Fellmongers' Hall; 52.71064°N 2.75902°W	—	Early 16th century	The former fellmongers' hall, later a community centre, is timber framed, with a brick ground floor and a tile roof. It is in two and three storeys, and has a canted plan, having been built in two phases. The windows are casements.	II
Old Crow Flats; 52.71079°N 2.75944°W	—	Early 16th century	A public house, later converted into flats, it is timber framed with some brick infill in the ground floor and a tile roof. There are two storeys with attics, and three bays, the right two bays gabled. In the right bay is a square bay window, over which is an oriel window with a hipped roof. The upper storey is jettied with a moulded bressumer, and the windows are casements.	II
90 and 91 Frankwell; 52.71193°N 2.76071°W	—	16th century	Two houses, later a shop, it is timber framed, and the main block was refronted in brick in the 18th century. It has a tile roof, two storeys and an attic, a front of two bays, and a rear wing. In the ground floor is a shop front and a passageway to the left. The upper floor contains sash windows with cambered heads, there is a gabled attic dormer, and there is exposed timber framing in the rear wing.	II
135 Frankwell; 52.71107°N 2.75816°W	—	16th century (probable)	A shop, probably originally a house, it was refronted in the 18th century. It is timber framed and clad in brick, and has a tile roof. There are two storeys and an attic, and two bays. In the ground floor is a shop front, above are sash windows, and there are two steep gabled dormers. In the gable walls is exposed timber framing.	II
50–53 Longden Coleham; 52.70406°N 2.74826°W	—	16th century (probable)	A row of shops with a timber framed core that were refronted in brick in the 18th century. They have tile roofs and two storeys with attics, shop fronts in the ground floor, sash windows in the upper floor, and gabled dormers. The older shop to the left has two bays, and to the right is a pair of higher shops with two bays each, and there is a passageway between the older and newer shops.	II
Park Cottage; 52.70828°N 2.74308°W	—	16th century	A timber framed house with a tile roof, two storeys, and the gable facing the street. The doorway has a vestigial hood, and the windows are casements.	II
Park Social Club; 52.70816°N 2.74308°W	—	16th century (probable)	At one time a hotel, the oldest part is a gabled cross-wing on the left. This is rendered over timber framing, and has two storeys and an attic, the upper floor jettied. The main part dates from the late 17th century, it is in brick encasing timber framing, with a string course, a modillion eaves cornice, and a tile roof. There are two storeys and an east front of five bays divided by pilasters. The windows are mullioned and transomed, and there are three gabled dormers.	II*
The Wheatsheaf Public House; 52.71109°N 2.75991°W		16th century (possible)	The public house has a timber framed core, and has been refronted in rendered brick. There is a tile roof, two storeys, three bays, and a rear wing. On the front facing the road are three bow windows on the ground floor, and casement windows above.	II
178–182 Abbey Foregate and 21 Brook Road; 52.70710°N 2.74201°W		Late 16th century	A row of houses, some converted into shops, they are timber framed with a tile roof. There are two storeys, and eight bays consisting of a long range and a cross-wing. In the ground floor are shop fronts, the windows are casements, and the upper floor is jettied with a moulded bressumer.	II
4, 5 and 6 Frankwell; 52.71078°N 2.75910°W		Late 16th century	A row of shops, originally with workshops above, they are timber framed, the ground floor is infilled with brick, and they have a tile roof. There are three storeys, and four bays; the upper storey is jettied and has a moulded bressumer. In the ground floor are shop fronts, and there is a central arched passageway to the rear. The middle floor contains mullioned and transomed windows, irregularly spaced, and in the top floor are four oriel windows with moulded bressumers.	II*
106 and 107 Frankwell; 52.71142°N 2.75991°W	—	Late 16th century	Two houses, later a shop, it is timber framed with a tile roof. There are two storeys and an attic, and four bays. The ground floor has been replaced in brick, it contains a doorway flanked by plate glass windows, and there is another doorway to the right. In the upper floor are casement windows, and there are three gabled attic dormers.	II
115 and 116 Frankwell; 52.71100°N 2.75953°W	—	Late 16th century	A house, later a shop, it is timber framed with a tile roof. There are two storeys and a gabled attic, the upper floor jettied with a moulded bressumer, and two bays. In the ground floor is a 20th-century recessed shop front, the upper floor contains two square oriel windows, above these is a band of blind balustrading, and in the attic are casement windows.	II
126 and 127 Frankwell; 52.71097°N 2.75881°W		Late 16th century	An inn, later used for other purposes, it is timber framed and has a tile roof. There are three storeys and an attic, the upper storeys jettied, and three bays. In the ground floor are shop fronts, and two doorways with four-centred arched heads. In the upper floors, the windows in the left bay are sash windows, and in the other bays are oriel windows in the middle floor, mullioned and transomed windows in the top floor, and two gabled dormers above with decorative bargeboards and finials.	II*
Conduit head 52.69546°N 2.78232°W	—	Late 16th century	The conduit head, which was altered later, was a collecting tank to provide water for the town. The building associated with it is in sandstone, with timber framing in the gables, and a tile roof, and it consists of a single chamber with a doorway in the gable end. Inside is a brick-lined water tank.	II
The Dun Cow Public House; 52.70674°N 2.74081°W		Late 16th century	The public house is timber framed, the ground floor is rendered, and it has a tile roof. There are two storeys, three bays with jettied gables, and a long rear wing. The porch projects, and has Doric shafts and an entablature carrying a sculpted cow. In the ground floor are sash windows and a fixed window, and above the windows are casements.	II
Boundary wall, Whitehall; 52.70777°N 2.73865°W	—	Late 16th century	The boundary wall was later altered and repaired. It is in sandstone, with some brick, and tiled copings. It contains an archway providing access to the walled garden.	II
Whitehall; 52.70786°N 2.73805°W		1578–82	A house, later used for other purposes, it is in sandstone with an internal timber frame, string courses, a triglyph frieze, a parapet, and tiled roofs. There are two storeys, basements and attics, and a square plan with three gabled bays on each front. The porch has fluted pilasters and a frieze, and the windows are mullioned and transomed. In the centre is an octagonal belvedere with an ogee lead roof and a weathervane.	II*
Dovecote, Whitehall; 52.70750°N 2.73739°W	—	c. 1580	The dovecote is in red and blue brick, and has a corbel table with trefoil arches, and a tile roof. It has an octagonal plan, and a single entrance with a stone lintel. On the roof is a timber cupola with an ogee lead cap and a weathervane. The internal walls are lined with nesting boxes.	II
Whitehall Gatehouse; 52.70794°N 2.73845°W		c. 1580	The gatehouse is in red sandstone and has a tile roof with a gable on each front. There are two storeys, and a central segmental-headed gateway flanked by mullioned windows, above which is a mullioned and transomed window. To the left is a small gabled turret, and behind this a timber framed bellcote with brick infill, and a clock face at the rear.	II*
164, 165 and 166 Abbey Foregate; 52.70675°N 2.74077°W		Late 16th or early 17th century	A row of three houses, one used as a shop, they are timber framed with a tile roof. There are two storeys and attics, and each house has two bays. The doorways have various surrounds, some windows are casements and some are sashes, and there are four dormers that have gables with fretted bargeboards and finials.	II
17, 19 and 21 Mount Street; 52.71234°N 2.75910°W	—	16th or 17th century (possible)	A row of three cottages that were later refaced, they are roughcast, and have a coved eaves cornice, tile roofs, one storey and attics. No. 17 has a gabled porch and an oriel window to the right, No. 19 has a porch on posts and casement windows, and No. 21 has a lean-to porch, and also has casement windows. Each cottage has a gabled dormer with overhanging bargeboards on brackets.	II
The Boat House Inn; 52.70884°N 2.76402°W		Late 16th or early 17th century	The public house was later extended. The early parts are timber framed, the extensions are in brick with timber cladding, and the roof is tiled. There are two storeys and an attic, five gables of differing widths on the front, and a flat-roofed extension to the south. The windows are casements and there are two roof dormers.	II
The Old Buck's Head Inn; 52.71172°N 2.76197°W		16th or early 17th century (probable)	The public house was refaced in the 18th century. It is in brick with a timber framed core, and has a tile roof. The main range has one and two storeys and an attic. It contains a carriage entry, with a round-headed doorway and sash windows to the left. To the right is an entrance flanked by shallow canted bay windows, and to the right of this is an incorporated previous shop with three storeys and one bay. In the roof are five gabled dormers.	II
113 and 114 Frankwell; 52.71107°N 2.75962°W	—	c. 1620	A pair of shops, probably originally houses, they are timber framed with a tile roof. There are two storeys and attics, and two bays. In the centre of the ground floor is a round-arched opening with decorative openwork in the tympanum. The upper storey is jettied and has a moulded bressumer. In the upper floor are two two-storey square bay windows containing bands of mullioned and transomed windows, above and below which are bands of balustrading. The attics are gabled and contain two-light windows.	II*
133 and 134 Frankwell; 52.71104°N 2.75827°W		Early 17th century (probable)	A timber framed house and shop with some brick and with a tile roof. There are two storeys and attics, and each part has one bay. In the ground floor is a shop window and a doorway to the left, and a shop front to the right. The upper floor contains a continuous band of mullioned windows, the attics are jettied, and have gables with bargeboards and finials.	II
Building to the rear of 1A Horsefair; 52.70833°N 2.74379°W	—	Early 17th century	Originally a warehouse, it is timber framed with a tile roof, and has two storeys and five bays.	II
Statues in Library, Shrewsbury School; 52.70447°N 2.76482°W	—	Early 17th century	Set into the gable wall of the library are the statues of Philomathes and Polymathes, which have been resited. They are in sandstone and stand in shell niches between fluted Ionic pilasters. Above are Greek inscriptions and obelisks, and beneath are a coat of arms and an inscription in Latin.	II
29 and 31 Abbey Foregate; 52.70791°N 2.74421°W		17th century or earlier	A pair of houses that were refaced in the early 18th century. They are timber framed and encased in brick, and have a band, and a tile roof. There are two storeys and an attic, and five bays. In the ground floor, the first bay contains a doorway with a moulded architrave, and an entablature on console brackets, in the fifth bay is a simple doorway with a fanlight, and in the middle bay is a passageway door. The windows are mullioned and transomed with segmental heads and keystones, and the middle window in the upper floor is blind. Above are two gables containing casement windows, and there is exposed timber framing in the gable ends.	II
11, 12 and 14 Coton Hill; 52.71524°N 2.75358°W	—	17th century	A row of three timber framed cottages that were refronted in brick in the 18th century. The roofs are partly in Welsh slate, and are partly tiled. They have one storey and attics, the middle cottage has two bays, and the others have one bay each. No. 11 has a door with a gabled hood and casement windows. No. 12 has a string course, a central doorway flanked by inserted windows, and two gabled dormers. No. 14 has a doorway with a moulded architrave, a canted bay window to the right, and a gabled dormer.	II
Nobold Grange; 52.68698°N 2.77950°W	—	17th century	A house that was altered and extended in the 18th and 19th centuries. The early part is timber framed, the later parts are in red brick, it is partly rendered, and has a tile roof. The main block has two storeys and four bays. There is a gabled porch, and most of the windows are sashes. To the right is a long lower timber-framed range on a stone plinth, with one storey and an attic. It contains various doors, windows and vents, and there are two dormers.	II
105 Abbey Foregate; 52.70594°N 2.73637°W	—	Late 17th century	A brick cottage on a stone plinth, with possibly a timber framed core, and a tile roof. There is one storey and an attic, and two bays. Steps lead up to a central doorway that has a fanlight and a cambered head. The flanking windows are casements, also with cambered heads, and there are two small gabled dormers with latticed windows.	II
5, 6 and 7 Holyhead Road; 52.71552°N 2.79119°W	—	Late 17th century (probable)	A row of three cottages, timber framed with brick infill and roughcast. They have tile roofs with stepped coping, one storey with attics, and one bay each. Two of the cottages have gabled hoods, the windows are casements with transoms, and each cottage has a gabled dormer with fretted bargeboards.	II
Gravelhill; 52.71998°N 2.76797°W	—	Late 17th century (probable)	A brick house with a string course, angle pilasters, and a hipped tile roof. There are two storeys and an attic, three bays, and a lower east wing linked to a two-storey service wing. In the main block is a doorway with a moulded architrave and a fanlight. This is flanked by tripartite windows, the upper floor contains sash windows, and there are two hipped dormers. The wing has an ogee gable and pilasters.	II
5 New Street; 52.71133°N 2.76051°W	—	Late 17th or early 18th century	Probably originally a house, later a shop, it is in painted brick, and has a tile roof with a coped gable to the left. There are two storeys and an attic, and two bays. In the ground floor is a shop window and a door to the left, the upper floor contains two windows with cambered heads, and there is a large attic dormer with a hipped roof.	II
The Court House; 52.71195°N 2.75914°W	—	Late 17th or early 18th century	A brick house with a string course and a hipped tile roof. There are two storeys and attics, and five bays. The doorway has a fanlight, the windows are sashes with stuccoed heads, and there are gabled attic dormers. Across the front is a 20th-century conservatory.	II
The Crown Public House; 52.70385°N 2.74940°W		Late 17th or early 18th century	The public house is in painted brick with sill bands and a tile roof. There are two storeys and an attic, five bays, and a rear wing. In the centre is a doorway, the windows are sashes, and there are two gabled dormers.	II
The Plough Public House; 52.71458°N 2.74874°W		Late 17th to early 18th century	The public house was extended in the 19th century and later. It is in rendered brick with tile roofs. There are two storeys and an L-shaped plan, the original block has two bays, the extension to the left is gabled, and there is a rear wing. The windows are sashes.	II
Railings and gates, Abbey House; 52.70794°N 2.74196°W		c. 1720	In front of the garden is a low stone wall with railings, and in the centre are decorative wrought iron gates. These are flanked by brick walls with stone copings.	II*
The Crown Inn (26 and 27 Abbey Foregate); 52.70757°N 2.74493°W		1725	A house, later a public house, it is in painted brick, with quoins, string courses, and a tile roof. There are two storeys and attics, and five bays. The doorway has a segmental head and a keystone, the windows are sashes with moulded keystones, and there are two dormers with ornate shaped gables and ball finials.	II
15 and 15A Abbey Foregate; 52.70746°N 2.74515°W	—	Early 18th century	A pair of shops that were refronted in the early 19th century. They are in brick with parapet eaves, and a tile roof with a crow-stepped gable. There are three storeys and five bays. In the ground floor are shop fronts and on the right is a doorway with a moulded architrave. The upper floors contain sash windows.	II
22 Abbey Foregate; 52.70765°N 2.74475°W	—	Early 18th century	A house, later a shop, in brick with a modillion eaves cornice, and a tile roof with coped gables. There are three storeys, three bays, and a parallel rear range with a crow-stepped gable. In the ground floor is a late 19th-century shop front that has an architrave with fluted moulding and a fascia with a central swept pediment. The upper floors contain sash windows.	II
23 Abbey Foregate; 52.70770°N 2.74470°W		Early 18th century	A house, later a restaurant, with a possibly earlier core, it is in brick, and has a tile roof with a crow-stepped gable. There are two storeys, and the gable end faces the street. In the ground floor is a shop front, and above is an inserted window.	II
33–36 Abbey Foregate; 52.70813°N 2.74337°W	—	Early 18th century	A row of houses, at one time shops, in painted brick with a tile roof and a coped gable on the left. There are three storeys and nine bays. The windows are sashes, some of which are blind.	II
69 Abbey Foregate; 52.70682°N 2.73984°W	—	Early 18th century	A brick house on a corner site with a tile roof, two storeys and attics, and five bays. The doorway in the gable end has a moulded architrave and scrolled console brackets. Most of the windows are sashes, and there are three gabled dormers.	II
193 Abbey Foregate; 52.70689°N 2.74474°W	—	Early 18th century	A brick house with a string course and a hipped tile roof. There are two storeys, four bays, and a lower two-storey wing to the west. Many of the windows and doors have been boarded over.	II
19 Frankwell; 52.71117°N 2.75998°W	—	Early 18th century	A shop with an earlier timber framed core, it is in rendered brick and has a tile roof. There are two storeys and an attic, and two bays. In the ground floor is a shop front with bow windows and a doorway between, over which is a continuous fascia on console brackets. To the left is an arched passage entry, the upper floor contains two sash windows, and there are two gabled attic dormers.	II
1–4 Holyhead Road; 52.71528°N 2.79172°W	—	Early 18th century (probable)	A row of three cottages and a house that have been extensively restored, they are in brick with tile roofs. The cottages have one storey and attics, some have porches, the windows are casements, and there are attic dormers. The house has two storeys and an attic, two parallel gables, a short wing on the left, and its windows are also casements.	II
Stable block, Abbey House; 52.70807°N 2.74158°W	—	Early 18th century	The former stable block, later converted for other uses, is in brick with stone dressings on a moulded stone coped plinth, with a modillion eaves cornice and a hipped tile roof. There are fronts of four and two bays. The building contains a wide segmentally-arched carriage entrance, a doorway with a fanlight, and mullioned and transomed windows.	II
Bank Farmhouse and St Mary's Grange; 52.69465°N 2.77499°W	—	Early 18th century	A pair of houses in painted brick with string courses and a tile roof. There are two storeys and attics, and each house has five bays. The windows are renewed casements with transoms, and there are five gabled dormers.	II
Kingsland House; 52.70837°N 2.74186°W	—	Early 18th century	The house, formerly Abbeydale House and later offices, is in brick with angle quoins, and a Welsh slate roof with stone coped gables. There are two storeys and attics, and a front of seven bays. In the centre is a doorway with an architrave and an open pediment. The windows are sashes and there are three hip roofed dormers with flanking scroll decoration.	II
Sutton House Farmhouse; 52.68988°N 2.73729°W	—	Early 18th century	The house, which possibly has an earlier core, is in rendered brick, and has a Welsh slate roof with coped gables. There are two storeys, four bays, and a later rear wing. The doorway has a fanlight, in the ground floor are sash windows, and the upper floor contains casement windows.	II
The Crown Inn (28 Abbey Foregate); 52.70762°N 2.74483°W	—	Early 18th century	A house, later integrated into a public house, it is in painted brick with string courses and a tile roof. There are two storeys with attics, and five bays. In the ground floor is a doorway and a passage entry to the right. The windows are sashes, and there are two dormers.	II
Outbuildings, Whitehall; 52.70795°N 2.73687°W	—	Early 18th century	Originally stables, and later used for other purposes, possibly incorporating earlier material, the outbuildings are in brick, with roofs of Harnage slate and some tiles. There are two ranges, one with two storeys, and the other with one storey and an attic. At the rear is a continuous outshut, and there is a further range to the right. The building contains various doors and windows, and louvred roof dormers.	II
Abbey House; 52.70794°N 2.74168°W		1730 (probable)	A brick house with quoins, a cornice, and a tile roof. There are three storeys, a double-pile plan, and six bays. The central doorway has a moulded architrave with Doric pilasters, and an entablature with a blind balustrade. To the right is a canted bay window, and the other windows are sashes, those in the lower two floors with segmental heads and keystones. At the rear are round-headed staircase windows and casements.	II*
1 and 2 Limetree Cottages; 52.69123°N 2.76281°W	—	1743	A pair of brick houses that were extensively altered in the early 19th century. They have a dentilled eaves band, a tile roof, two storeys and four bays. The doorways have segmental heads, most of the windows are casements, and there is a datestone between the upper windows.	II
Millington's Hospital and wall 52.71197°N 2.76344°W	—	1748	Almshouses that were remodelled in 1782 by John Hiram Haycock, they are in brick with stone dressings, and have a Welsh slate roof. There are two storeys and a basement, and eleven bays, the outer bays projecting, and with a pediment above the advanced middle three bays. The central doorway has a porch with Tuscan columns and an entablature. The windows are sashes, those in the ground floor with voussoirs. The pediment contains a clock, and above it is a cupola with a domed cap and a dated weathervane. The outer bays have a parapet with urns. Enclosing the forecourt is a low brick wall with gate piers, the outer ones with flat pyramidal caps, and the inner ones with acorn finials.	II
116, 117 and 118 Abbey Foregate; 52.70547°N 2.73478°W	—	Mid 18th century	A row of brick houses incorporating earlier material. They are in brick with a tile roof and have timber framing at the rear. There are two storeys and attics, and five bays. The left doorway has a segmental head, and the right doorway has a reeded architrave, panelled rebates, a traceried fanlight, and a canopy on console brackets. The windows are sashes and there are five attic dormers.	II
11–14 New Street; 52.71103°N 2.76134°W	—	Mid 18th century	A row of four houses, one later a shop, possibly incorporating earlier material, in brick with a dentilled eaves band and a Welsh slate roof. There are two storeys and attics, and each house has two bays. No. 11 has a shop window, the other windows are casements, and each house has an attic dormer.	II
124 and 125 Frankwell; 52.71096°N 2.75897°W	—	18th century	A pair of shops, probably originally houses, with a possible earlier core, in rendered brick with a tile roof and a coped gable on the left. No. 124 has two storeys and No. 125 has three, but both are of the same height, and each shop has two bays. In the ground floor are 20th-century shop fronts, and above are sash windows.	II
Meole Cottage; 52.69154°N 2.75910°W	—	Mid 18th century (possible)	The house, which was later extended, is in brick with roofs of tile and Welsh slate. It contains a main block and a rear wing at right angles. Features include two bow windows, one full-height, sash windows with voussoirs, and a coped gable at the rear.	II
Nobold Hall; 52.68733°N 2.77865°W	—	Mid 18th century	A rendered brick house that has a tile roof with coped gables. There are two storeys, five bays, and two rear wings. The central doorway has a traceried fanlight and a pediment. The windows are mullioned and transomed with segmental heads.	II
Old School House and Prudence Cottage; 52.69172°N 2.76228°W	—	18th century	A pair of cottages, possibly incorporating earlier material, and with later alterations. They are in brick with a string course and a hipped tile roof. The cottages partly have two storeys, and partly one storey and an attic. Old School House has a canted bay window and a lean-to porch, and Prudence Cottage has a gabled porch and two gabled dormers. The other windows are casements.	II
The Old Bush Inn; 52.70584°N 2.73676°W	—	Mid 18th century	The former public house is in painted brick, possibly on an earlier core, with a tile roof. There are two storeys and an attic, and three bays, with two gables facing the street. In the centre is a doorway with a moulded architrave. The ground floor contains sash windows, with casement windows in the upper floor, and horizontally-sliding sashes in the attic. The gables have ornate fretted bargeboards.	II
Kingsland Bank; 52.70268°N 2.75834°W	—	1759	A house designed by Thomas Farnolls Pritchard and altered in 1860 and later, it is in stuccoed brick, with a moulded eaves cornice and a Welsh slate roof. There are three storeys, a front of three bays, the middle bay slightly advanced and pedimented, flanking recessed single-storey wings with pedimented gables, and a rear wing. The central porch has pilasters carrying a cornice and a balustrade, and the windows are sashes.	II
Main Building, Shrewsbury School; 52.70389°N 2.76211°W		1759–65	Originally a hospital designed by Thomas Farnolls Pritchard, it was converted into a school by Arthur Blomfield in 1878–82. It is in brick with a Welsh slate roof, and has three storeys and attics, and a front of 13 bays. The middle three bays project forward and have rusticated brick quoins and a pediment with an oculus flanked by balustrades. In the centre is a round-arched doorway with paired pilasters and a balustraded parapet, above which is a tripartite window with a segmentally-arched pedimented entablature. The windows are sashes with architraves, those in the middle floor with pediments, and in the roof are dormers. In the centre of the roof is a copper cupola with a clock and balustrading.	II
English Bridge; 52.70660°N 2.74751°W		1769–74	The bridge carries the A5191 road over the River Severn. It was designed by John Gwynn, and was rebuilt and widened in 1924–25. The bridge is built in Grinshill sandstone, and consists of seven semicircular arches. It has channelled voussoirs, triple keystones, the central ones carved with heads, cutwaters with moulded pyramids, the largest two carved as dolphins, and balustrading with ball finials on pilasters, and a central inscribed panel with a pediment.	II*
71 and 72 Abbey Foregate; 52.70663°N 2.73914°W	—	Late 18th century	A pair of brick houses with a Welsh slate roof. There are three storeys and three bays. The doorway to No. 71 has a pediment and that to No. 72 has a moulded architrave. The windows are sashes, those in the lower two floors with grooved lintels and tripartite keystones.	II
139 Abbey Foregate; 52.70568°N 2.73633°W	—	Late 18th century	A brick house with a modillion cornice, and a Welsh slate roof with coped gables. There are two storeys and an attic, three bays, and a lean-to on the right. The central doorway has an architrave, a moulded entablature, and a pediment. The windows are sashes, and there are two gabled attic dormers.	II
140 Abbey Foregate; 52.70578°N 2.73659°W	—	Late 18th century	A brick house with a dentilled eaves cornice and a Welsh slate roof. There are two storeys and two bays. The doorway to the left has an architrave, the windows are mullioned and transomed with segmental-arched heads, and there are two gabled dormers with fretted bargeboards.	II
77 and 78 Frankwell; 52.71185°N 2.76158°W	—	Late 18th century	A pair of brick houses with a dentilled eaves band and a Welsh slate roof. There are three storeys, and each house has two bays. The inner bays contain doorways with fanlights and open pediments, and in the upper floors are blind windows. The outer bays each contains a tripartite window in the ground floor and sash windows above.	II
88 and 89 Frankwell; 52.71192°N 2.76084°W	—	Late 18th century	A pair of houses later used for other purposes, with an earlier core. The building is in brick with a tile roof, two storeys and an attic, and three bays. In the ground floor are shop fronts, the upper floor contains two casement windows with a blind window between, and there are two dormers with hipped roofs.	II
98 Frankwell; 52.71168°N 2.76024°W	—	Late 18th century	A house, later a shop, with an earlier, possibly timber framed core, it is in brick with parapet eaves and a tile roof. There are three storeys, a cellar, and one bay. In the ground floor is a doorway with a fanlight, and a shop window to the right. The middle floor contains a sash window, and there is a blocked window in the top floor.	II
99 Frankwell; 52.71164°N 2.76016°W	—	Late 18th century	A house with possibly an earlier core, it is in brick with a tile roof. There are two storeys and two bays, and the doorway has a moulded architrave. To its left is a sash window, to the right is a casement window, and in the upper floor are horizontally-sliding sashes.	II
132 Frankwell; 52.71101°N 2.75836°W	—	Late 18th century	A shop, probably originally a house, it has an earlier core. The shop is in brick over timber framing and has a Welsh slate roof. There are three storeys and an attic, and two bays. In the ground floor is a shop front, above are sash windows, and there are two gabled dormers. There is exposed timber framing in the gable walls.	II
136 Frankwell; 52.71110°N 2.75807°W	—	Late 18th century	A shop, possibly originally a house, it is in brick with a moulded eaves cornice and a Welsh slate roof. There are four storeys and three bays. In the ground floor are three round-arched openings, the left a passage entry, the middle one a window, and at the right is a doorway. Above, the bays are flanked and divided by pilasters, they contain sash windows, and over the second storey is a cornice.	II
116 and 117 Longden Coleham; 52.70392°N 2.74924°W	—	Late 18th century	Originally part of a foundry, later two shops, they are in brick with a tile roof. There are three storeys and ten bays. In the ground floor are shop fronts, and in the upper floor are fixed windows and blocked openings.	II
11A and 15 Mount Street; 52.71218°N 2.75894°W	—	Late 18th century	Three brick houses consisting of a main block of three storeys and five bays, and an extension to the right with two storeys and two bays. The main block has a string course and a parapet. The bays are alternately advanced and recessed, the recessed bays having arched heads. The windows in the middle bay are blind, and elsewhere they are sashes. The doorways are in the outer bays and each has a reeded architrave, a semicircular fanlight, and an entablature on consoles. On the extension is an inserted dormer.	II
1 Bank Farm Cottages and stable range 52.69466°N 2.77445°W	—	Late 18th century	The stable range has been converted into cottages. The buildings form a terrace of six cottages, in brick with dentilled eaves and tile roofs. They have one storey with attics, one bay each, casement windows and gabled dormers.	II
2 and 3 Bank Farm Cottages; 52.69473°N 2.77469°W	—	Late 18th century	A pair of cottages in brick, partly roughcast, with a tile roof. There is one storey and attics, and each cottage has two bays. The cottages contain a porch, doorways, casement windows and attic dormers.	II
Barn, Bank Farm; 52.69446°N 2.77430°W	—	Late 18th century	The barn is in brick and has a tile roof with crow-stepped coped gables. Originally with one storey, an upper storey has been inserted. The barn contains three full-height entrances, casement windows, cruciform vents, and roof dormers.	II
Ivy House; 52.69128°N 2.76124°W	—	Late 18th century	A brick house that has a Welsh slate roof with a coped gable to the right. There are two storeys and four bays. The doorway has an architrave with console brackets, and the windows are sashes.	II
Long Meadow and Pear Tree Cottage; 52.70414°N 2.73414°W	—	Late 18th century	A barn that was converted into a house and a cottage in 1948, probably incorporating earlier material. It is partly timber framed and partly in brick on a plinth, and has a tile roof. There are two storeys, a gabled porch, and casement windows.	II
Mile post at SJ 5063 1205; 52.70345°N 2.73153°W		Late 18th century	The mile post is by a roundabout, it is in stone, and has three faces. On two faces are inscribed the distances in miles to Wellington, Shifnal, Birmingham, Oxford, London, Wenlock, Bridgnorth, Worcester, Bristol, and Bath.	II
Monklands; 52.70617°N 2.73914°W	—	Late 18th century	A house, later used for other purposes, in brick with a moulded eaves cornice, and a Welsh slate roof with coped gables. It consists of a central block with three storeys and five bays, flanked by wings with two storeys and one bay each. In the centre is a stuccoed porch with Doric columns, a triglyph frieze, and a balustraded parapet. Flanking the porch are round-headed windows above which is a string course, and in the upper floors are sash windows, the central windows with architraves. Each wing contains a Venetian window with a pediment, and above is a sash window with an architrave and a keystone.	II
Mytton Villa; 52.70720°N 2.79128°W	—	Late 18th century	A house, later subdivided, in brick that has a parapet with ball finials and a Welsh slate roof. There are three storeys and three bays, and the main block is flanked by pavilions. In the centre is a portico with a triglyph frieze in the entablature. This is flanked by bay windows, and the windows in the upper floors are sashes. The pavilions have hipped roofs, and contain round-arched panels with tripartite windows.	II
The Anchor Public House; 52.71112°N 2.75797°W		Late 18th century	The public house, which has an earlier core, is in brick with some timber framing, a moulded eaves cornice and a Welsh slate roof. There are four storeys, three bays, and a rear wing. In the ground floor is a pub entrance with a central doorway, and above are sash windows. The rear wing contains timber framing.	II
Vicarage Cottages; 52.69097°N 2.76332°W	—	Late 18th century	A pair of brick houses with a tile roof, two storeys, five bays, and a single-storey wing at the right. The ground floor windows are sashes, and in the upper floor they are casements.	II
Meole Brace Hall; 52.68964°N 2.76207°W	—	c. 1780	A brick house with a stuccoed sill band, a modillion eaves cornice, and a tile roof. There are three storeys, and the house has a three-bay range, a recessed single-storey wing to the right, and a rear service block. The central porch has fluted Greek Doric columns and an entablature with a triglyph frieze. To the left of the porch is a tripartite sash window with a segmental head and a fan motif, and to the right is a canted bay window. The upper floors contain sash windows, and on the garden front is a bow window.	II
Former Shrewsbury Prison; 52.71189°N 2.74792°W		1787–93	The prison was designed by John Hiram Haycock and extended in 1883–88. It is built in brick with stone dressings and has Welsh slate roofs, and consists of four wings around a courtyard in a walled enclosure. The oldest part is 'B' wing which has survived, together with the governor's house, which has been converted for other uses. This wing has two and three storeys. The other wings are the result of the later extension, 'A' wing with four storeys, 'C' wing with two, and 'D' wing with three storeys.	II
Gatehouse and perimeter wall, Former Shrewsbury Prison; 52.71175°N 2.74814°W		1788–93	The gatehouse and perimeter wall were designed by John Hiram Haycock. The gatehouse is in brick with a front of rusticated stone, a parapet, and a Welsh slate roof. It has two storeys and three bays, the outer bays forming drum towers. The central bay has a round-headed vehicular entrance, above which is a cast iron latticed window, and a shaped gable with a broken segmental pediment with a niche containing a marble bust of John Howard. The perimeter wall is in red brick with stone coping, it contains stone piers, and encloses a roughly rectangular area.	II
Kingsland House; 52.70324°N 2.76918°W	—	c. 1790	A house, later part of a school, it was extended in about 1930. It is built in brick with a stuccoed cornice and parapet, and has a Welsh slate roof. There are three storeys, seven bays, and a later range to the right. The stone porch has Ionic shafts and a balustrade, and there is a small doorway to the right. In the centre is a bow window with balustrading, flanked by full-height casement windows, and the other windows are sashes.	II
Welsh Bridge; 52.71024°N 2.75811°W		1792–95	The bridge carries the A488 road across the River Severn. It is in stone, and consists of five segmental arches, and a towpath arch at the north end. The bridge has voussoirs, pilasters, cutwaters, and a balustraded parapet with cast iron lamp fittings.	II*
Ditherington Flax Mill; 52.71973°N 2.74365°W		1796–1800	The first building in the world with a full iron frame, it was designed by Charles Bage, and was converted for use as a maltings in 1887–88. The main mill is built in large bricks and has a Welsh slate roof. The main building has four storeys and an attic, 17 bays, two engine houses at the south end, and a three-storey timber-clad tower at the north end, which is surmounted by an ornamental crown in cast iron.	I
41 and 42 Abbey Foregate; 52.70770°N 2.74201°W	—	c. 1800	A pair of brick houses with dentilled eaves and a Welsh slate roof. There are three storeys and five bays. The doorways are approached by steps, and have open pediments, the house on the right also having plasterwork fan tracery in the tympanum. The windows are sashes with stuccoed heads.	II
46–49 Abbey Foregate; 52.70733°N 2.74180°W	—	c. 1800	A terrace of four brick houses curving round a corner, with plain oversailing eaves, and a tile roof with coped gables. There are three storeys and five bays. The doorways have moulded architraves and panelled rebates, and the windows are sashes with stuccoed heads.	II
133 Abbey Foregate; 52.70543°N 2.73564°W	—	c. 1800	A house in painted brick with a Welsh slate roof, two storeys, and four bays. Towards the left is a porch with a round-headed entrance, panelled decoration and a parapet, and to the right is a doorway with a moulded architrave. The windows are sashes, and there are two blocked windows.	II
25 Coton Hill; 52.71592°N 2.75341°W	—	c. 1800	The house possibly has an earlier core, it is in brick with a tile roof, and has three storeys and three bays. The central doorway has a gabled hood, and to the right is a round-arched passageway. The windows are sashes, and in the middle bay they are blind.	II
28–31 Coton Hill; 52.71608°N 2.75331°W	—	c. 1800	A terrace of four cottages with an earlier timber framed core that have been refronted in brick. They have a dentilled eaves band, a tile roof, two storeys and attics, and one bay each. In the centre is a passageway arch, the doorways are paired, the windows are sashes, and there are four gabled dormers.	II
11, 12 and 13 Frankwell; 52.71092°N 2.75974°W	—	c. 1800	A house and two shops in brick with a dentilled eaves band, a tile roof, three storeys and four bays. The house in the left bay has a doorway with a gabled porch and a casement window to the right. In the other bays is a shop front with a central round-arched passageway. Above the shop front is a continuous fascia on console brackets. The upper floors contain sash windows.	II
87 Frankwell; 52.71192°N 2.76096°W	—	c. 1800	A public house, later a private house, it is in brick with parapet eaves and a tile roof. There are three storeys and cellars, and three bays. The central doorway has a fanlight and a canopy on console brackets. The ground floor windows have architraves and hoods, in the middle floor the windows are sashes, the top floor contains casement windows, and in the middle bay the windows are blind.	II
93 Frankwell; 52.71185°N 2.76041°W	—	c. 1800	A house, later a shop, in brick with a dentilled eaves band, and a tile roof. There are three storeys and two bays. In the ground floor is a shop front, and to the right is a doorway with an architrave and panelled rebates. The upper floors contain sash windows.	II
94 and 95 Frankwell; 52.71181°N 2.76041°W	—	c. 1800	A house, later a shop, it is in brick with a dentilled eaves band and a tile roof. There are three storeys and three bays. To the left is a recessed shop front, and to the right is a shop front with a four-light mullioned and transomed window. In the upper floor are two sash windows flanking a blind window, all with segmental heads.	II
96 and 97 Frankwell; 52.71172°N 2.76031°W	—	c. 1800	A house and shop, possibly with an earlier core, they are in brick with parapet eaves, and have a tile roof with coped stepped gables. There are three storeys and three bays. The paired central doorways have plain architraves, to the left is a shop window, and the other windows are sashes.	II
100 Frankwell; 52.71162°N 2.76006°W	—	c. 1800	A shop and a house with earlier material, it is in brick with a timber framed core, dentilled eaves, and a tile roof. There are three storeys and three bays. In the ground floor is a 19th-century shop front with a central doorway, a panelled architrave, and a fascia on console brackets. The upper floors contain casement windows.	II
110 Frankwell; 52.71127°N 2.75980°W	—	c. 1800	A shop, possibly with an earlier core, it is in stuccoed brick with a tile roof. There are three storeys and two bays. In the ground floor is a shop front and a passage entry to the right. The upper floors contain sashes, those in the top floor being horizontally-sliding.	II
1–5 Mount Pleasant; 52.72736°N 2.74162°W	—	c. 1800	A terrace of five brick houses with a plain cornice and a Welsh slate roof. They have three storeys and each house has two bays. The doorways have moulded architraves and traceried fanlights, and the windows are sashes.	II
59 New Street; 52.70920°N 2.76346°W	—	c. 1800	The house is in painted brick with a tile roof, two storeys and three bays. The central doorway has a moulded architrave, a fanlight, and an entablature on console brackets, and the windows are sashes.	II
55 St Michael's Street; 52.71771°N 2.74569°W	—	c. 1800	Originally the house of the clerk to Ditherington Flax Mill, it is built in "great bricks", and has a hipped Welsh slate roof. There are two storeys and a basement at the rear, and three bays. The central doorway has an architrave and a fanlight, and the windows are sashes.	II
56–59 St Michael's Street; 52.71796°N 2.74534°W		c. 1800	A terrace of four houses, originally the apprentice house for Ditherington Flax Mill. The houses are built in "great bricks" with a Welsh slate roof, hipped to the right. There are three storeys and four bays. The doorways have pedimented hoods, and the windows are sashes with cambered heads. On the front is a painted plaque.	II
Severn Hill; 52.70746°N 2.76655°W	—	c. 1800	A house, extended in about 1925, later part of a school, it is in brick with pilasters, a coved cornice, and a Welsh slate roof. There are three storeys and three bays, a two-storey pavilion recessed to the left, and a later two-bay wing on the left. In the centre is a Tuscan portico and a doorway with a traceried fanlight, and the windows are sashes. The later wing contains a round-headed doorway with an architrave and a fanlight, and a parapet with a balustrade.	II
The Mount; 52.71281°N 2.76316°W		c. 1800	A brick house with a sill band, a cornice and a parapet. There are three storeys, five bays, a single-storey four-bay wing to the left, and a two-storey single-bay wing to the right, with a lower range containing a canted bay window and a lantern. In the centre of the main block is a porch with Tuscan columns, and an entablature with a triglyph frieze, and the windows are sashes. The house was the birthplace of Charles Darwin.	II*
The Mount House; 52.71285°N 2.76477°W	—	c. 1800	A brick house with a Welsh slate roof and an L-shaped plan. There are three storeys, and a front of two bays. The doorway at the rear has a traceried fanlight and an open pediment. Most of the windows are sash windows with wide segmental heads, and in the top floor are lunettes.	II
Sutton Spa; 52.69139°N 2.73624°W	—	18th to 19th century	The spa consists of a small brick chamber with a stone slab, largely covered by an embankment, containing a mineral spring. There are stone steps on each side, a simple entrance, and an iron rail gate. Inside is a stone basin and a well.	II
1–4 The Armoury; 52.70056°N 2.72912°W	—	c. 1806	An officer's house and workshops, later a house and three cottages, in brick with Welsh slate roofs. The house has a sill band, a stuccoed eaves band, and a hipped roof. There are two storeys and three bays. The central doorway has a moulded architrave with a triglyph frieze, and the windows are sashes. The cottages are lower with two storeys, one bay each, and have doorways with segmental heads.	II
6 The Armoury and Armoury Mews; 52.70056°N 2.72827°W	—	c. 1806	An officer's house and workshops, later two houses, in brick with Welsh slate roofs. No. 6 has two storeys, three bays, a central doorway with a porch and sash windows. Armoury Mews has one storey and inserted windows, and attached to it is a boundary wall with a pier that has a chamfered stone capital.	II
7–12 The Armoury; 52.70029°N 2.72889°W	—	c. 1806	An officer's house and workshops, later four houses, in painted brick with Welsh slate roofs and two storeys. The former officer's house has a hipped roof, three bays, a central doorway, and sash windows. A lower range to the right has been converted into houses, and has five bays, casement windows, and a single-storey porch.	II
The Armoury; 52.70077°N 2.72865°W	—	c. 1806	A former armoury officer's house, it is in brick with a Welsh slate roof. There are two storeys and three bays, and a lower block to the right with a hipped roof. In the centre is a porch, The windows are sashes with splayed heads, and the middle window in the upper floor is blind.	II
Former magazine, The Armoury; 52.70089°N 2.72838°W	—	c. 1806	The former magazine, later used as a summer house, is in brick with a Welsh slate roof. It has a single storey and a single room. In the gable end is a gabled porch with a blocked entrance, and French doors have been inserted in the garden front.	II
Former punishment block, The Armoury; 52.70039°N 2.72908°W	—	c. 1806	The punishment block has since been used for other purposes. It is in brick with a hipped Welsh slate roof. There are doorways in the gable ends, one of which is blocked, and other openings, also blocked.	II
Former Brewery; 52.70300°N 2.75222°W		1806–07	The former brewery has been converted into living accommodation, and is in brick with a Welsh slate roof. It consists of four main buildings, a four-storey brewhouse, a three-storey engine house with a tall square chimney, a two-storey cooling house with three bays, and to the east a single-storey range with a basement of eight arcaded bays.	II
5–9 Severn Street; 52.70330°N 2.74529°W		c. 1806–09	Originally a weaving factory, it was converted into five houses in about 1860. They are in brick with an iron-framed structure and a Welsh slate roof. There are three storeys, and each house has one bay. The doorways have architraves and fanlights, and the windows are sashes. Inside are cast iron columns and beams, and brick arches.	II
Dyehouse and Stove House, Ditherington Flax Mill; 52.71990°N 2.74402°W		Before 1810	The older building is the stove house, with the dyehouse dating from the early 1850s, and both were later altered. They are built in brick with roofs of slate, and the dyehouse also has some corrugated asbestos sheet. The stove house has a rectangular plan, three storeys, and ranges of one and two storeys. The dyehouse has a square plan with two parallel ranges, and a single storey. On the east front is an arcade of twelve bays. The buildings contain various openings, some of which are blocked, and the dyehouse also has hoist towers.	II*
Flax Warehouse, Ditherington Flax Mill; 52.72014°N 2.74330°W	—	c. 1810	The warehouse, later converted into a maltings, has an iron frame construction with brick walls, and a roof of Welsh slate and corrugated sheeting. It has a rectangular plan, four storeys and attics, and nine bays. There are segmental-arched doorways, and few windows.	I
Apprentice House, Ditherington Flax Mill; 52.72039°N 2.74335°W		1812	The building is in red brick with dressings in brick and stone, a dentilled eaves cornice, and a Welsh slate roof with pedimented gables. There is a rectangular plan, three storeys with cellars and attics, and six bays. In the lower two floors the windows are mullioned and transomed, in the top floor they are sashes, and there are various doorways.	II*
Cross Building, Ditherington Flax Mill; 52.72009°N 2.74378°W		1812	The building was originally used for heckling, and later as a maltings. It has an iron frame construction with walls in large and standard bricks, and a roof of Welsh slate and corrugated sheeting. It has a dentilled eaves cornice, a chamfered string course, four storeys and an attic, and twelve bays, and there is a projecting five-storey stair block. Most of the windows are blocked.	I
Lord Hill's Column; 52.70420°N 2.73182°W		1814–16	The column commemorates Rowland Hill, 1st Viscount Hill. It was designed by Edward Haycock with modifications by Thomas Harrison. The column is in Grinshill sandstone and is surmounted by a statue of Lord Hill in Coade stone by Joseph Panzetta. The monument consists of a fluted Greek Doric column on a star-shaped plinth with lions couchant, and is 151 feet (46 m) high.	II*
74 and 75 Abbey Foregate; 52.70656°N 2.73889°W	—	c. 1820	A pair of brick houses with an eaves parapet and a Welsh slate roof. There are three storeys and three bays. Towards to the right are paired doorways with moulded architraves, and to the left is a passage doorway. The windows are sashes.	II
121–124 Abbey Foregate and garden walls 52.70527°N 2.73422°W	—	c. 1820	A terrace of four stone houses with a cornice and a parapet, and a Welsh slate roof. They have a symmetrical front, with a central block of three storeys and six bays, and flanking wings of two storeys and four bays. The doorways have moulded architraves and traceried fanlights, and the windows are sashes. Running along the garden at the front of the houses is a wall consisting of stone blocks surmounted by a pierced balustrade with angle piers and domed caps.	II
72 The Mount; 52.71290°N 2.76877°W	—	1820s	A brick house with a Welsh slate roof, it has two storeys, three bays, the middle bay projecting, and a later pedimented wing on the right. Across the front is a verandah, and the windows are sashes.	II
64 Abbey Foregate; 52.70698°N 2.74048°W	—	Early 19th century	A brick house with two central pilasters, a dentilled eaves band, and a tile roof. There are three storeys and a basement, and two bays. On the right is a doorway with a moulded architrave and a fanlight, and the windows are sashes.	II
131 Abbey Foregate; 52.70507°N 2.73455°W	—	Early 19th century	A house in rendered brick with a Welsh slate roof, two storeys and two bays. The central doorway has an architrave, and the windows are casements.	II
134 Abbey Foregate; 52.70550°N 2.73583°W	—	Early 19th century	A rendered brick house that has a Welsh slate roof with coped gables. There are two storeys and three bays. The central doorway has a fanlight and a pediment, and the windows are sashes.	II
146–149 Abbey Foregate; 52.70591°N 2.73728°W	—	Early 19th century	A group of four brick houses with a Welsh slate roof. There are two storeys, four bays, and a central round-arched entrance with a pediment. The doorways have moulded architraves, fanlights, and an entablature on console brackets. The windows are sashes, and there are two side entrances.	II
1–7 Church Row, stable and coach house 52.69108°N 2.76071°W	—	Early 19th century	A row of seven cottages with an adjoining stable and coach house. They are in brick with a dentilled eaves band and Welsh slate roofs. The cottages have two storeys, doorways with plain surrounds, and most of the windows are sashes. The stable has one storey and inserted garage doors. The coach house has two storeys, and its windows include an oculus in the gable end.	II
1–4 Coleham Head; 52.70595°N 2.74580°W	—	Early 19th century	A terrace of four houses in brick with a Welsh slate roof. There are three storeys, and each house has one bay. The doorways have moulded architraves, panelled rebates, traceried fanlights, and entablatures on console brackets. The windows are sashes with stuccoed heads.	II
5–9 Coleham Head; 52.70606°N 2.74602°W	—	Early 19th century	A terrace of five brick houses with a Welsh slate roof and coped gables. There are three storeys, and each house has one bay. The doorways have architraves, traceried fanlights, and pediments, the windows are sashes with stuccoed heads, and in the upper storey are half-dormers.	II
27 Coton Hill; 52.71598°N 2.75339°W	—	Early 19th century	The house, which has an earlier core, is roughcast, and has a tile roof. There are two storeys and two bays. The doorway is in the left bay and has a moulded architrave, the window above it is blind, and in the left bay are sash windows.	II
73 and 74 Coton Hill; 52.71388°N 2.75229°W	—	Early 19th century	A pair of houses, remodelled from an earlier structure, in stuccoed brick, with a cornice, a stepped parapet, and a Welsh slate roof. There are two storeys and attics, and five bays. The doorways have architraves, traceried fanlights, and canopy hoods. In the ground floor are three canted bay windows, the upper floor contains sash windows, and there are three roof dormers.	II
64–71 Frankwell; 52.71201°N 2.76217°W	—	Early 19th century	A terrace of eight brick houses with a dentilled eaves band and a tile roof. There are two storeys, and each house has one bay, a doorway with a cambered head, and a sash window to the right. In the upper floor most houses have casement windows.	II
131, 132 and 133 Longden Coleham; 52.70425°N 2.74791°W		Early 19th century	Originally a tannery, later used for other purposes, the building is in painted brick with a Welsh slate roof. It is in three and two storeys, and has eight bays divided by pilasters. In the ground floor are a doorway, an archway, small-paned windows and, at the right, a shop front. The upper floors contain casement windows.	II
3 and 4 New Street; 52.71138°N 2.76036°W	—	Early 19th century	A pair of houses, one later a shop, possibly incorporating earlier material, in painted brick with a dentilled eaves cornice, a tile roof, and two storeys. Each house has a doorway with a moulded architrave. In the ground floor of No. 3 is a shop window, and No. 4 has a casement window. Elsewhere the windows are also casements.	II
7 and 9 Havelock Road; 52.69935°N 2.74737°W	—	Early 19th century	A pair of brick houses with a Welsh slate roof and three storeys, and each house has three bays. They both have a central doorway with a moulded surround and a fanlight, flanked by canted bay windows. In the upper floors are sash windows, and along the front is a continuous verandah porch carried on latticed hollow cast iron columns.	II
4–18 Preston Street; 52.70430°N 2.7305°W	—	Early 19th century	A terrace of eight brick houses with a Welsh slate roof. They have two storeys, a double-depth plan, and one bay each. The doorways have moulded architraves and pediments, and the windows are sashes with painted or stuccoed heads.	II
17 and 19 The Mount; 52.71257°N 2.76501°W	—	Early 19th century	A pair of brick houses, stuccoed in the ground floor and roughcast above, with angle quoins, and a tile roof. There are two storeys and attics, and two bays. The doorways have pediments, the upper floor contains sash windows in architraves and there are two gabled dormers.	II
21, 23 and 25 The Mount; 52.71256°N 2.76524°W	—	Early 19th century	A row of three brick houses with a stepped eaves cornice. There are three storeys and four bays. On the front are three doorways with cambered heads, sash windows and one blind window.	II
56–70 The Mount; 52.71268°N 2.76818°W	—	Early 19th century	A terrace of eight brick houses with a dentilled eaves band and a Welsh slate roof. There are three storeys, and each house has one bay. The doorways have architraves, fanlights and pediments, and the windows are sashes with stuccoed heads.	II
Buck's Head Public House (part); 52.71184°N 2.76219°W	—	Early 19th century	A pair of cottages, later incorporated into the public house, they are in painted brick with dentilled eaves and a tile roof. There are two storeys and two bays. The doorways in the outer bays, which have architraves and small canopies, have been replaced by sash windows. The other windows are also sashes.	II
Canal Tavern and outbuildings 52.71454°N 2.74631°W		Early 19th century	The public house is in whitewashed brick and has a roof of Welsh slate and tile with coped gables. There are three storeys, three bays, a two-storey rear wing, and a lean-to on the left. The central porch has a doorway with a fanlight, and the windows are sashes with stuccoed lintels. To the right are brick outbuildings with a tile roof that contain an arched doorway, a bull's eye window, and a loft door.	II
Caradoc House; 52.70599°N 2.73804°W	—	Early 19th century	A brick house with a Welsh slate roof, three storeys and three bays, the middle bay advanced and pedimented. In the centre is a doorway with a moulded architrave and a fanlight. The windows are sashes, and to the right is a lower bay with a hipped roof.	II
Chaddeslode House; 52.70470°N 2.73487°W	—	Early 19th century	A house, later used for other purposes, it is in brick with a moulded eaves cornice, and a Welsh slate roof. There are two storeys and three bays. In the centre is a porch with Doric columns, and the windows are sashes with moulded architraves.	II
Doric column, English Bridge Gardens; 52.70721°N 2.74733°W	—	Early 19th century	The Doric column is in stone, and stands in an isolated position in the gardens.	II
Ice house, Coton Hill Farm; 52.71906°N 2.75459°W	—	Early 19th century (probable)	The ice house is in brick and is underground. It has an egg-shaped chamber and a right-angled passage leading into it.	II
Smithy and Office, Ditherington Flax Mill; 52.71950°N 2.74424°W		Early 19th century	The former smithy and office are built in "great bricks" and have a dentilled eaves cornice and a Welsh slate roof. There is a rectangular plan, and two storeys. In the ground floor are two sash windows and a doorway, all with segmental heads. The upper floor contains five smaller windows, a doorway approached by an external staircase, and to the right is a wall-mounted clock.	II
Stables and Packing Warehouse, Ditherington Flax Mill; 52.71938°N 2.74425°W		Early 19th century	The former stables are in red "great bricks" and it has a dentilled eaves cornice and a Welsh slate roof. It has a rectangular plan, two storeys, with a hayloft above, and two gabled bays. In the northeast front are two inserted openings and a taking-in door above. To the left are the remains of a former packing warehouse, which consist of a red brick wall with six segmental openings, now blocked.	II
Holywell Terrace; 52.70867°N 2.74050°W		Early 19th century	A symmetrical terrace of twelve houses in brick with tile roofs. They have three storeys and attics, and each house has two bays. The outer six bays at each end project forward, and along the front of the middle six houses is a continuous balcony with a wrought iron rail on timber posts, above which are French windows. The doorways have architraves, and some have porches. Some of the houses have bay windows, most of the windows are sashes, and there are gabled attic dormers.	II
Kingsland Grove; 52.70411°N 2.77133°W	—	Early 19th century	A brick house with a Welsh slate roof. It has three storeys, a main range of three bays, a projecting right wing, and a lower two-storey service wing to the north. The doorway in the angle has a moulded architrave and an entablature with console brackets. To the left is a square bay window, to the right is a full-height bow window, and the other windows are sashes.	II
Mile post at junction with Bell Lane; 52.70544°N 2.73500°W		Early 19th century	The mile post is at the junction of Abbey Foregate with Bell Lane, possibly not its original position. It has a triangular section and a raking top, and embossed lettering indicating the distances to London, Shifnal, and the County Hall.	II
Mile post on roundabout at SJ 5066 1206; 52.70341°N 2.73152°W	—	Early 19th century	The milepost, possibly not in its original position, is in cast iron and has three sides. Embossed letters indicate the distances in miles to Much Wenlock, "SALOP" (Shrewsbury) and Bridgnorth, and to the County Hall and the Town Hall.	II
New Park Farmhouse; 52.71921°N 2.73637°W	—	Early 19th century	A farmhouse, later a private house, it is in brick with a parapet and a Welsh slate roof. There are three storeys and three bays. The central doorway has an architrave and a pediment, and the windows are sashes.	II
Providence Terrace, railings and walkways 52.71049°N 2.76261°W	—	Early 19th century	A terrace of four brick houses with a Welsh slate roof, three storeys and basements. The basements protrude forward, and provide a walkway to the ground floor above. The steps and the walkway have ornate cast iron railings. In the basements are plain doors and cast iron windows. The ground floor has paired doorways with moulded architraves, fanlights, and cornice hoods on console brackets. The windows are sashes with stuccoed heads.	II
Ridgemount; 52.70623°N 2.76568°W	—	Early 19th century	A house that was extended in about 1926 into a school house by the addition of a rear wing. It is in brick with a coped parapet, and a Welsh slate roof, and has two storeys and four bays. In the centre is a Doric porch flanked by full-height canted bay windows. The windows are sashes. The rear wing is in Georgian style.	II
Rose Villa; 52.71403°N 2.80368°W	—	Early 19th century	A house in rendered brick with a tile roof, three storeys and three bays. In the centre is a porch flanked by canted bay windows. The windows in the middle floor are sashes with cambered heads, the top floor contains casement windows, and in the gable wall is a small lancet window.	II
Rosehill and conservatory 52.70301°N 2.74448°W	—	Early 19th century	A brick house with a Welsh slate roof, three storeys and three bays. The central porch has Tuscan columns, the windows are sashes. and there is one blind window in the top floor. To the right is a late 19th-century conservatory.	II
Summerhouse, Severn Hill; 52.70725°N 2.76595°W	—	Early 19th century	The summer house in the grounds of the house is in stuccoed brick and has a Welsh slate roof. It has an octagonal plan, the doorway and windows have round heads, and the roof is conical.	II
Sutton Hall; 52.68538°N 2.73762°W	—	Early 19th century	A farmhouse, possibly incorporating earlier material, in brick with parapet eaves, and a tile roof with a coped gable. There are two storeys, a front of three bays, a recessed bay to the left with a dentilled band and a hipped roof, to the rear is a parallel range, and a long rear range incorporating outbuildings. The central doorway has a moulded architrave and a fanlight. To its right is a full-height canted bay window, and the other windows are sashes.	II
The Elms; 52.70607°N 2.72552°W	—	Early 19th century	A red brick house on a plinth with a band, a moulded cornice, and a hipped Welsh slate roof. There are two storeys, five bays, and a wing recessed on the left. In the centre is a porch with four Doric columns, above the door is a fanlight, and the windows are sashes.	II
Folly, The Limes; 52.70242°N 2.74845°W	—	Early 19th century	The folly was installed in the garden in the garden in the 1860s by S. Pountney Smith. It consists of a stone arcade of three arches, originally part of a screen in St Mary Magdalene's Church, Battlefield.	II
The Lord Hill Hotel; 52.70513°N 2.73502°W		Early 19th century	The hotel is in brick with a hipped Welsh slate roof. There are two storeys, the central range has three bays, and there are projecting wings, on the left of two bays, and on the right of one bay. The central bay is advanced and has a segmental-arched recess and a pediment, and the windows are sashes.	II
The Swan Inn; 52.71191°N 2.76110°W		Early 19th century	The public house is in brick with a Welsh slate roof, three storeys and three bays. In the ground floor is a central window, the door to the left has a panelled architrave, the right door is recessed, and above them is a continuous fascia on brackets. The upper floors contain sash windows.	II
Stable block and cottage, The Mount; 52.71287°N 2.76392°W	—	Early 19th century	The building is in brick with a Welsh slate roof. The cottage has two storeys and three bays, with arcading in the ground floor, and the windows are casements. To the right is a one-storey, two-bay stable wing, and at the rear is a coach house wing with two storeys, containing doorways, a blind arcade, and an oculus.	II
York Cottage; 52.69901°N 2.76904°W	—	Early 19th century	A brick house with a tile roof, two storeys and four bays. The doorway has a simple moulded architrave, and the windows are sashes.	II
Milestone, The Mount; 52.71256°N 2.76591°W		1826–27	The milestone is in limestone, and is in the shape of a rectangle with a shallow pointed head. It contains a recessed cast iron plate inscribed with the distances to Holyhead and to "SALOP" (Shrewsbury).	II
St Michael's Church; 52.71801°N 2.74611°W	—	1829–30	The church, to which the chancel was added later, is now redundant and used for other purposes. It is in brick, the nave has a parapet and a Welsh slate roof, and the chancel has a tile roof. At the west end is a tower with a square base on which is a two-stepped octagonal lantern with a shallow lead cap. In the south wall of the tower is a doorway with a moulded architrave, above which is a clock. The nave contains round-arched windows, and the windows in the chancel are lancets.	II
32 Abbey Foregate; 52.70813°N 2.74368°W	—	c. 1830	A house, later a house and shop, it is in brick with a moulded cornice over the middle floor, a moulded eaves parapet, and a hipped tile roof. There are three storeys and four bays. In the centre is a doorway with a moulded architrave, to the left is a shop front with a cornice and a fascia, and the windows are sashes.	II
73A Abbey Foregate; 52.70658°N 2.73899°W	—	c. 1830	A brick house with a Welsh slate roof, two storeys, two bays, and the gable facing the road. The doorway to the left has a moulded architrave, and the windows are sashes with stone lintels.	II
106 and 107 Abbey Foregate; 52.70586°N 2.73626°W	—	c. 1830	A pair of brick houses with a Welsh slate roof, two storeys and four bays. The doorways have plain architraves, and the windows are sashes.	II
129 Abbey Foregate; 52.70468°N 2.73426°W	—	c. 1830	A stuccoed brick house with a Welsh slate roof. The main block has two storeys, and the service block, recessed to the left, has three storeys. The west front has three bays, the ground floor projecting under a hipped roof, and it contains French doors. The garden front has four bays, and at the right end is a full-height segmental bay window. The windows are sashes, some with moulded architraves.	II
183–187 Abbey Foregate; 52.70719°N 2.74262°W	—	c. 1830	A terrace of five brick houses, one rendered, with a Welsh slate roof. There are two storeys and six bays. The doorways have pediments on curved consoles, and the windows are sashes with stuccoed heads.	II
85 and 87 Belle Vue Road; 52.70014°N 2.74780°W	—	c. 1830	A pair of brick houses with a hipped Welsh slate roof. There are two storeys, four bays, and lower recessed single-bay wings at the sides. The doorways in the central bays have simple architraves and fanlights. The windows in the main block are sashes, and in the wings they are small-paned casements.	II
Brierly House; 52.70482°N 2.73402°W	—	c. 1830	A stuccoed brick house with hipped Welsh slate roofs. There are three storeys, a main block of three bays, and a recessed service wing to the right with two bays. In the centre is a porch with a hipped roof, and the ground floor of the right bay projects. The windows are sashes with moulded architraves.	II
Broome Cottage and walls 52.69106°N 2.75972°W	—	c. 1830	A brick house with an overhanging hipped Welsh slate roof. There are two storeys and three bays, the middle bay projecting. It has a large gabled porch and the windows are sashes. Flanking the house on each side are concave curving garden walls.	II
Cadogan House and stable 52.71241°N 2.76944°W	—	c. 1830	The house, stable and coach house are in brick with Welsh slate roofs. The house has a hipped roof, two storeys, and an L-shaped plan, with fronts of five bays. The east front has a doorway with Doric columns, an architrave, a fanlight, and an entablature. In the north front is a doorway with a moulded architrave, and an entablature on console brackets. The windows are sashes. The stable and coach house adjoin to the west, they have two storeys, doorways and windows, and a loft entry.	II
Melville House and Wheatlea House; 52.69184°N 2.75959°W	—	c. 1830	A pair of brick houses with a wood eaves cornice and a Welsh slate roof. There are two storeys, and four bays, flanked by recessed parallel wings. The windows are sashes, and there is one blind window.	II
Severn Lodge and wall 52.70929°N 2.76337°W	—	c. 1830	A house in painted brick with a Welsh slate roof in Tudor Revival style. There are two storeys and an attic, with three bays on the road front. This contains a doorway with a four-centred arched head, side lights and a hood mould. In the upper floor are mullioned and transomed windows with hood moulds, and the attic contains casement windows. The left wing has a coped and stepped gable and it contains a sash window. To the left is a doorway with a four-centred arch, a hood mould and carved spandrels, over which is a coped gable with a finial. The east front has a stepped coped gable, and a canted bay window with a cast iron parapet. To the left of the front is a brick garden wall with stone copings.	II
St George's Church; 52.71227°N 2.76014°W		1832	The church was designed by John Hiram Haycock in Early English style. It is built in Grinshill sandstone over brick, and has a Welsh slate roof. The church has a cruciform plan, consisting of a nave, north and south transepts. a chancel, and a west tower embraced by the nave. The tower has three stages, a west doorway, a corbel table with gargoyles, and an embattled parapet with crocketed pinnacles. The windows in the church are lancets.	II
The Butter Market; 52.71229°N 2.74921°W		1835–36	Originally a market for butter and cheese, it has since been used for other purposes. The front facing Howard Street is stuccoed and in Greek Revival style. There are seven bays, the central bay containing two giant fluted Doric columns and two square columns carrying an entablature with a cornice and a parapet. The doorway is round-headed and above it is a pulley. The flanking bays contain round-headed windows, and the outside bays are pedimented. The left front facing Wharf Street is in brick, apart from the right bay, which is stuccoed. There are six bays, the outer bays pedimented, the fourth bay containing a round-headed loading bay, and the other bays with round-headed windows, and smaller windows or doors with segmental heads below.	II
Whitehall Terrace, wall and gate piers 52.70799°N 2.74067°W		c. 1836	A terrace of four houses at right angles to the street. They are in brick with a stuccoed ground floor, a cornice, a parapet and a Welsh slate roof with coped gables. There are three storeys and eight bays, the central four bays projecting. In the ground floor are round-arched doorways, in front is a cast iron veranda and a balcony with latticework railings. In the middle floor are French windows, those in the outer bays with pedimented heads, and those in the central bays with flat entablatures on console brackets. The other windows are sashes. The boundary wall is in brick with stone coping, there are gate piers with pyramidal copings, and a cast iron gate.	II
76 Abbey Foregate; 52.70651°N 2.73876°W	—	c.1840	A stuccoed house with an earlier core, a sill band, and a Welsh slate roof. There are three storeys and two bays. The doorway to the left has a moulded architrave and console brackets. In the lower two floors are sash windows, and the top floor contains a casement window. There is an exposed timber roof truss in the left gable wall.	II
108 Abbey Foregate; 52.70602°N 2.73597°W	—	c.1840	A brick house with a moulded eaves cornice, and a Welsh slate roof with coped gables. There are three storeys and three bays. In the centre is a wrought iron latticed porch and a doorway with a moulded architrave, and the windows are sashes.	II
112, 113 and 114 Abbey Foregate; 52.70570°N 2.73566°W	—	c.1840	A terrace of three brick houses with an eaves cornice and a Welsh slate roof. There are two storeys and each house has two bays. The doorways are in the left bays, and have round-arched heads and fanlights, and the windows are sashes.	II
119 and 120 Abbey Foregate; 52.70542°N 2.73455°W	—	c.1840	A pair of houses in buff brick with a Welsh slate roof. There are two storeys, attics and basements, and four bays, the outer bays projecting and gabled. The doorways in the inner bays are round-headed and have fanlights. They are flanked by canted bay windows. The other windows are sashes, those in the outer bays have moulded architraves and pediments, and the attic windows have round heads.	II
188–192 Abbey Foregate and railings 52.70725°N 2.74291°W	—	c.1840	A row of five brick houses, some painted or stuccoed, with a moulded eaves cornice, and a Welsh slate roof. There are three storeys and a basement, and seven bays. Steps lead up to the doorways that have moulded architraves, fanlights, and an entablature on curved consoles. The windows are sashes, those in the outer bays with keystones. There are railings on stone plinths in front of the basement areas and flanking the steps.	II
41–52 New Street; 52.70991°N 2.76274°W	—	c.1840	A terrace of twelve brick houses with Welsh slate roofs. They have two storeys and each house has one bay. The doorways have moulded architraves and flat hoods on conrole brackets, and the windows are sashes.	II
53–57 New Street; 52.70958°N 2.76303°W	—	c.1840	A terrace of five painted brick houses with Welsh slate roofs. Each house has one bay, Nos. 53 and 54 have three storeys, and the others have two. The round-headed doorways have traceried fanlights, the windows are sashes, and No. 57 has a gabled dormer.	II
39–47 Whitehall Street; 52.70817°N 2.73997°W		c.1840	A terrace of five brick houses with a Welsh slate roof. There are two storeys, and each house has two bays. The doorways have panelled architraves, fanlights, and entablatures on console brackets. The windows are sashes.	II
The Old Bell Inn; 52.70562°N 2.73547°W		c.1840	The public house is in painted brick with a Welsh slate roof. There are three storeys and four bays. The central doorway has a moulded architrave with reeded console brackets. To the right of the doorway is an oriel window, and the other windows are sashes.	II
Whitehall Place; 52.70794°N 2.73978°W	—	c.1840	A terrace of 16 stuccoed brick houses with a Welsh slate roof. There are two storeys, and each house has two bays. The doorways have moulded architraves, traceried fanlights, and entablatures on console brackets. The windows are sashes, and in the upper floor are wrought iron balconies, separate on the outer houses and continuous in the centre.	II
Shelton Hospital; 52.71257°N 2.80021°W		1843	Originally a mental hospital designed by George Gilbert Scott and William Bonython Moffatt in Tudor Revival style, it was later extended, then used for other purposes. It is built in brick with stone dressings and Welsh slate roofs. The hospital originally had an H-shaped plan with two storeys, an entrance block and a rear wing.	II
1 and 2 New Street; 52.71141°N 2.76028°W	—	1844	A pair of brick houses with a Welsh slate roof, three storeys and one bay each. The round-headed doorways have architraves and fanlights, and the windows are sashes. Between the top windows is a dated and initialled shield.	II
75 and 76 Coton Hill; 52.71370°N 2.75214°W		1840s (probable)	A pair of houses in Neoclassical style, they are in stuccoed brick with a moulded cornice and parapet, and a Welsh slate roof. There are two storeys and five bays. The doorways have an architrave, a traceried fanlight, and a flat entablature. The windows are sashes, and there are five recessed dormers with segmental heads.	II
Belvidere Bridge; 52.70829°N 2.71275°W		1848	The bridge, No. 438, was built to carry the Wolverhampton–Shrewsbury line over the River Severn, and was designed by William Baker. It is in cast iron, with sandstone piers and retaining walls in engineering brick. The bridge consists of two segmental skew arches, the central pier having a rounded cutwater. The arches have lattice spandrels, and there is a balustrade.	II*
54–59 Abbey Foregate; 52.70718°N 2.74111°W	—	c.1850	A terrace of six brick houses with a Welsh slate roof. They have two storeys, attics and basements, and eight bays. The houses are arranged in pairs, each having paired doorways with fanlights approached by steps. The windows are sashes, those in the ground floor projecting with architraves. There are five coped gabled attic dormers.	II
60, 61 and 62 Abbey Foregate and railings 52.70711°N 2.74085°W	—	c.1850	A terrace of three brick houses with an eaves parapet, and a Welsh slate roof with Dutch gables. They have two storeys, attics and basements, and each house has two bays. In the ground floor are steps leading up to round-arched doorways, and canted bay windows, and above are sash windows with moulded stone architraves. Flanking the steps and enclosing the basement areas are railings and stone piers.	II
65 Abbey Foregate; 52.70696°N 2.74028°W	—	c.1850	A brick house with a moulded eaves cornice, and a Welsh slate roof with coped gables. There are two storeys and three bays. The central doorway has a moulded architrave with fluted shafts, a fanlight, and console brackets. The windows are sashes.	II
10–17 Severn Street; 52.71318°N 2.74511°W	—	c.1850	A terrace of eight brick houses with Welsh slate roofs. There are two storeys and each house has one bay. The doorways has small hoods, and the windows are sashes.	II
Brooklands; 52.70217°N 2.73176°W	—	c.1850	The house is faced in ashlar stone, it has a Welsh slate roof, and is in Italianate style. There are two storeys, four bays, and a projecting gabled wing to the left. In the angle is a doorway with a round-arched porch, and the windows are sashes with architraves. At the rear the windows are pedimented, and in the garden front are canted bay windows. On the roof is a belvedere with arcading, and a pyramidal roof and a weathervane.	II
Carmel House; 52.71233°N 2.76771°W	—	c.1850	A brick house with a hipped Welsh slate roof. There are two storeys and three bays, the central bay with a pedimented gable, and the outer bays projecting. The central doorway has an architrave and a heavy entablature, and the outer bays contain square bay windows. The other windows are sashes, and the rear is divided into two bays by pilasters.	II
Cedar House; 52.71232°N 2.76722°W	—	c.1850	A brick house with a coved eaves cornice on paired brackets, and a Welsh slate roof. There are two storeys and three bays. The central entrance has a porch with Doric columns and an entablature, and paired doors. The windows are sashes.	II
52 and 53 Abbey Foregate, walls and railings 52.70727°N 2.74150°W	—	Mid 19th century	A pair of brick houses with Welsh slate roofs, they have two storeys, attics and basements, and five bays, three of them gabled. Flights of steps with cast iron railings lead up to central doorways, one with a pointed head, the other with a fanlight. Most of the windows are mullioned and transomed and contain sashes. To the left is a wide two-storey canted bay window, and there are three attic dormers. In front of the basement area are railings and walls consisting of massive stone blocks.	II
66 and 67 Abbey Foregate and railings 52.70689°N 2.74013°W	—	Mid 19th century	A pair of brick houses with a string course, an eaves parapet, and a Welsh slate roof. There are three storeys and basements, and four bays. Steps lead up to paired central doorways in a portico porch with three fluted Doric columns and a triglyph frieze. Flanking the doorways are two-storey canted bay windows, and the other windows are sashes with moulded architraves and entablatures. Enclosing the basement area are railings.	II
68 Abbey Foregate; 52.70684°N 2.73997°W	—	Mid 19th century	A brick house with a string course, an eaves parapet, and a Welsh slate roof. There are three storeys and basements, and three bays. Steps lead up to a portico porch with paired fluted Doric columns and a triglyph frieze. Flanking the porch are two-storey canted bay windows. The other windows are sashes with moulded architraves, the middle window in the middle floor has a pediment, and there is a wide dormer.	II
10 New Street; 52.71107°N 2.76123°W	—	Mid 19th century	A brick house on a corner site with a plain eaves band and a tile roof. There are three storeys and two bays. Across the corner is an inserted recessed shop front with a fascia carried out on a cast iron column. The upper floors contain sash windows with stuccoed heads.	II
2, 3 and 4 Severn Street; 52.71343°N 2.74561°W	—	Mid 19th century	A row of three brick houses with dentilled eaves and a Welsh slate roof. There are two storeys, and each house has one bay. The doorways have small hoods, and the windows are sashes.	II
Coton Hurst; 52.71591°N 2.75277°W	—	Mid 19th century	A house in late Georgian style, built in brick with a Welsh slate roof. There are two storeys, four bays on the garden front, and three on the entrance front. In the centre is a porch with fluted Doric columns, an architrave, and a pediment, and the windows are sashes.	II
Laurel Cottage; 52.71061°N 2.76248°W	—	Mid 19th century	A brick house with a Welsh slate roof, two storeys and three bays. The central doorway has an architrave, a fanlight, and an entablature on console brackets. This is flanked by canted bay windows, and in the upper floor are sash windows with stuccoed heads.	II
Pengwern House; 52.71069°N 2.76242°W	—	Mid 19th century	A brick house with a Welsh slate roof, two storeys and three bays. The central doorway has an architrave, a fanlight, and an entablature on console brackets. This is flanked by canted bay windows, and in the upper floor are sash windows with stuccoed heads.	II
Wall and gate piers, Monklands; 52.70635°N 2.73914°W	—	Mid 19th century	The boundary wall is in brick with stone copings, and along it are pilasters with flat pyramidal caps. Two pilasters form gate piers towards the left, and the main gate piers towards the right have concave steep pyramidal copings.	II
Water pump, Ridgemount; 52.70874°N 2.76448°W	—	Mid 19th century	The water pump is in cast iron. It has a short fluted shaft with raised lettering and a lion's head motif, and is surmounted by a domed cap.	II
The Old House; 52.70326°N 2.76042°W	—	Mid 19th century	The house is in red brick with dressings in yellow brick and a Welsh slate roof. There are two storeys and an attic, and a front of two bays facing the river. On the left return is a two-storey lean-to porch with a round-arched entrance. Most of the windows are mullioned and transomed, there are two casement windows and an oriel window. The gables have ornate fretted bargeboards.	II
102–105 Frankwell; 52.71148°N 2.76001°W		1851	Originally almshouses, later divided into apartments, the building is in brick with a tile roof. There are three storeys and three bays. In the centre is a round-headed doorway with a keystone, and the windows are sashes with stuccoed heads. To the right of the doorway is an inscribed plaque.	II
Hospital of the Holy Cross, wall and gate piers 52.70813°N 2.74414°W		1853	Almshouses designed by Samuel Pountney Smith in Gothic style, they are in sandstone with tile roofs. There are two ranges, both with two storeys. The west range has two bays, coped gables with finials, paired moulded four-centred arched doorways, mullioned windows with hood moulds, and an oriel window. The north range has similar features, three bays, and a ground floor arcade. Enclosing the courtyard is a stone wall with wrought iron railings and a central gateway with a four-centred arch, a buttressed surround, and a cross finial, and containing wrought iron gates.	II
Christ Church, Bicton Heath; 52.71400°N 2.80199°W		1854	The church, designed by Edward Haycock in Early English style, is built in stone and has tile roofs. It consists of a nave, a south porch, and a chancel with an organ chamber and a vestry. On the west gable is a bellcote, and the windows are lancets.	II
Chapel, Shelton Hospital; 52.71173°N 2.79943°W	—	c. 1854–56	The chapel is in brick with stone dressings and a Welsh slate roof, and is in Early English style. It consists of a nave, north and south aisles, and a chancel. At the west end is a buttress and a corbelled-out bellcote, and the windows are lancets.	II
Shrewsbury General Cemetery Buildings; 52.69772°N 2.75973°W		1856	The group of buildings at the entrance to the cemetery was designed by S. Pountney Smith in Gothic style, and is built in sandstone. The group consists of a pair of lodges flanking the entrance, and a porte-cochère with a timber roof linked by a cloister range to a steeple flanked by chapels. The steeple has a three-stage tower, an embattled parapet with corbel heads and pinnacles, and an octagonal spire with three tiers of lucarnes.	II
50 and 51 Abbey Foregate; 52.70732°N 2.74168°W	—	c.1860	A pair of brick houses with a moulded eaves cornice and a Welsh slate roof. There are two storeys, attics and basements, and five bays. In the outer bays, steps lead up to doorways that have fanlights and hood moulds, and in the adjacent bays are canted bay windows. The other windows are mullioned and transomed sash windows with hood moulds. At the top are two coped gables with finials. The basement areas are enclosed by railings.	II
102 and 103 Abbey Foregate; 52.70602°N 2.73662°W		c.1860	A pair of brick houses with a moulded eaves cornice and a tile roof. They are in Gothic style, and have two storeys and a symmetrical front of four bays, all the bays gabled. The outer bays project and are joined by a verandah behind which are casement windows. The outer bays project and contain a canted bay window in the ground floor and a corbelled out gabled dormer above, and the inner bays contain smaller dormers. The prominent chimneys have diagonal flues.	II
United Reformed Church; 52.70680°N 2.74631°W		1863	The church is in white stone with dressings in red sandstone and a Welsh slate roof. It consists of a nave with a clerestory, a small chancel, and a southwest steeple. The steeple has a tower with two stages, angle buttresses, and a broach spire with lucarnes, a finial, and a weathercock. The west window has five lights and is in Decorated style.	II
Holy Trinity Church, Meole Brace; 52.69024°N 2.76168°W		1867–70	The church is built in rusticated red sandstone with dressings in paler stone, and it has a tile roof with ridge cresting. The church consists of a nave clasping the west tower, north and south lean-to aisles, north and south transepts, and a chancel with a polygonal apse. The tower has four stages, angle buttresses, a clock face on the west front, a quatrefoil frieze, a corbel table, an embattled parapet, and a short spire with a weathervane.	II*
Water pump, Belle Vue Road; 52.70363°N 2.74502°W	—	c. 1870	The conduit head is at the junction with Belle Vue Road with Betton Street. It is in cast iron, and consists of a short fluted shaft with a domed cap decorated with a lion's head and an inscription.	II
Water pump, St Michael's Street; 52.71666°N 2.74670°W		c. 1870	The conduit head is in the pavement of St Michael's Street. It is in cast iron, and consists of a short fluted shaft with a domed cap decorated with a ram's head over a former spout, and an inscription.	II
Water pump, Sundorne Road; 52.72663°N 2.73470°W	—	c. 1870	The conduit head is in the pavement of Sundorne Road. It is in cast iron, and consists of a short fluted shaft with a domed cap decorated with a lion's head over a former spout, and an inscription.	II
The Limes; 52.70218°N 2.74893°W	—	1870s	A house designed by Samuel Pountney Smith for his own use, incorporating earlier material. The ground floor is in stone, the upper parts are timber framed, and the roof is tiled. There are two storeys, a partial cellar and attics. The house consists of a hall range, a cross-wing, and a longer slightly recessed service range. The porch is timber framed, and to the right is a square bay window. Elsewhere there are oriel windows and casements.	II
All Saints Church; 52.71411°N 2.74326°W		1875–79	The church is built in polychromatic stone and has a tile roof. It consists of a nave with a clerestory, a chancel, north and south aisles extending along the chancel, and a north vestry, chapel and organ chamber. There is a rose window at the west end, alternating pointed and round windows in the clerestory, and the east window has a pointed arch and five lights.	II
81–84 Frankwell; 52.71188°N 2.76126°W	—	Late 19th century	A terrace of three houses incorporating earlier material. They are in brick with a Welsh slate roof, three storeys, and each house has one bay. The doorways and the windows in the lower floors have cambered blue brick heads. The windows are sashes, and at the rear is exposed timber framing.	II
Pengwern Boat House; 52.70516°N 2.76339°W		Late 19th century	The boathouse is in brick with applied timber and it has a tile roof. There are two storeys, the lower storey projecting towards the river providing a boat store with a flat roof and arches facing the river. The house is gabled, and has a lean-to and a right wing. There is a canted bay window with French windows, the other windows are a mix of casements and sashes, and there are two wide gabled dormers.	II
Rockery, English Bridge Gardens; 52.70701°N 2.74716°W	—	Late 19th century (probable)	The rockery consists of a collection of fragments of sculpture in antique style. These include a figure of Justice, ears of wheat, cornucopia, and a coat of arms.	II
Statue of Viscount Hill; 52.70768°N 2.74714°W	—	1876	The statue was originally in Hawkstone Park and was moved to its present site in 1907. It consists of a marble statue of Viscount Hill by Matthew Noble standing on a polished granite plinth.	II
Kinnersley House; 52.70147°N 2.74814°W	—	1876–80	A house, originally a pair, designed by Samuel Pountney Smith in French Baroque style, it is built in Grinshill sandstone with red sandstone dressings at the front, brick at the rear, and a mansard roof in Westmorland slate. There are two storeys and attics, six bays, and two staircase towers at the rear. The doorways have architraves and entablatures on console brackets. At the front are canted bay windows, one with a wrought iron balustrade, the other windows are sashes, and there are three dormers.	II
Morfe House; 52.70119°N 2.74768°W	—	1876–80	A house, originally a pair, designed by Samuel Pountney Smith in French Baroque style, it is built in Grinshill sandstone with red sandstone dressings at the front, brick at the rear, and a mansard roof in Westmorland slate. There are two storeys and attics, and two bays. The doorways are on the sides, and have architraves, and entablatures on console brackets. In the ground floor are square bay windows containing casements with cast iron balustrading above, in the upper floor are sash windows, in the roof are dormers, and at the rear are canted bay windows and stair windows.	II
Churchill's Hall, Shrewsbury School; 52.70190°N 2.76357°W	—	1879–81	The school building, designed by William White, is in red brick and has tiled roofs. There are two parallel ranges of two storeys, with a three-storey two-window range block to right of centre, parallel rear ranges and wings. The windows are mullioned and transomed, and other features include gables, canted bay windows, some with tile-hung aprons, and dormers.	II
Rigg's Hall, Shrewsbury School; 52.70250°N 2.76204°W	—	1879–81	The school building, designed by William White, is in brick and has tiled roofs with ridge cresting. It is in two and three storeys, with a main range, a parallel rear range and two rear wings. The windows are mullioned and transomed, and other features include gables, canted bay windows, some with tile-hung aprons, and dormers.	II
School House, Shrewsbury School; 52.70346°N 2.76137°W	—	1879–82	The school building was designed by Arthur Blomfield in Queen Anne style. It is in brick with terracotta dressings, sill bands, a coved cornice, and hipped roofs of Welsh slate and tile. The main block has three storeys and an attic, and ten bays, and there is a rear range of four storeys. On the front is a projecting porch with fluted pilasters and balustrading, and the paired doors have a traceried fanlight. Most of the windows are sashes with entablatures, and there are hip roofed dormers.	II
Water pump, Ashton Road; 52.70179°N 2.76297°W	—	c.1880	The water pump stands near to a road junction. It is in cast iron and has a fluted shaft and cap, a lion's head and a raised inscription.	II
Kingsland Bridge; 52.70437°N 2.75895°W		1883	The bridge carries Kingsland Bridge Road over the River Severn, and was originally a toll bridge. It is in cast iron and has stone piers with angle quoins. The piers have moulded caps and cast iron lanterns.	II
Kingsland Grange; 52.69852°N 2.76610°W	—	1884	A house, later a school, it has a sandstone ground floor, applied timber framing above, and a tile roof. There are three storeys and four bays, including a service block on the left. The right bay projects and is gabled, and contains a square bay window. In the centre is a gabled porch, the windows are sashes, and the gables have decorative bressumers and bargeboards. In the garden front are parallel gables, and a large canted bay window.	II
Moser's Hall, Shrewsbury School; 52.70159°N 2.76262°W	—	1884	The school building, designed by William White, is in red brick and has tiled roofs with cresting. There are three storeys and a basement, four gables on the main front, and three bays on the Ashton Road front. The entrance is through a porch with a hipped roof and a moulded archway. There are two bay windows, one full-height, and the other windows are mullioned and transomed.	II
Chapel, Shrewsbury School; 52.70404°N 2.76325°W		1887	The school chapel, designed by Arthur Blomfield in Early English style, is built in red sandstone with dressings in Bath stone and a tile roof. It consists of a nave, a western narthex with north and south porches, a chancel with north and south chapels, and an octagonal turret with a small spire at the southeast. The windows are lancets, mostly grouped in threes.	II
Maltings Kiln, Ditherington Flax Mill; 52.72000°N 2.74335°W		1896–97	The maltings kiln was designed by Henry Stopes. It is in red brick with a pyramidal slate roof topped by a cowl. The kiln has a rectangular plan with three storeys and three bays. In the east front is a three-bay arcade containing windows, and there are various other openings.	II
Coleham Pumping Station; 52.70455°N 2.74662°W		1901	A former sewage pumping station, later a museum, it consists of an engine house, a boiler house, a coal store, a chimney and a flue. They are built in red Ruabon brick with sandstone dressings, and the roof is in Coalbrookdale clay tiles. The engine house has a gabled front of three bays with quoins. In the centre, steps lead up to a doorway with a keystone and a pediment, and above it is a large round headed window. The doorway is flanked by smaller round-headed windows with keystones, and above are windows with flat heads. Along the sides are three bays with two tiers of similar windows, and on the roof is an octagonal louvred vent with a lead cap. At the rear are the lower parallel boiler house and coal store, and the square chimney that has a panelled shaft. Inside the engine house are two beam engines.	II
71, 73 and 75 The Mount; 52.71295°N 2.77176°W	—	1902	A terrace of three brick houses designed by Frank Shayler in Arts and Crafts style; No 73 was designed for himself and named The Red House. The houses have some tile hanging and tiled roofs, two storeys and attics, and a front of eleven bays with four gables. The outer houses have doorways with gabled hoods, and No. 73 has a flat hood. Each house has a canted bay window, and a mix of casement windows, sash windows and cross-windows. The interior of No.73 has been little altered, and includes an entrance hall with an inglenook.	II
Crewe Junction Signal box 52.71293°N 2.75091°W		1902–03	The signal box was built for the London and North Western and Great Western Railways. It is in brick with a weatherboarded top storey and a slate roof. There are four storeys, and in the top storey facing the railway is a full-length range of horizontally-sliding sash windows. External steps lead up to the operating floor. The signal box is 35 feet (11 m) high, nearly 100 feet (30 m) long, and 13 feet (4.0 m) wide, and it has a 180-lever frame.	II
Severn Bridge Junction Signal Box; 52.70944°N 2.74601°W		1903	The signal box was built for the London and North Western and Great Western Railways. It is in brick with a glazed timber top storey and a slate roof. There are three storeys and six bays. In the bottom storey are blocked windows, the middle storey contains small segmental-arched windows in recessed panels with dentilled cornices, and in the top storey are horizontally-sliding sash windows. The signal box contains a 120-lever frame.	II
69 Monkmoor Road; 52.71089°N 2.73682°W	—	1910	A semi-detached house in red brick with a hipped tile roof. There are two storeys and an attic, a double-depth plan, two bays, and a long service range at the rear. The smaller right bay contains the doorway, and to the left is a two-storey canted bay window. The windows are sashes, and in the attic is a wide gabled dormer. The house was the home of the war poet Wilfred Owen.	II
Oldham's Hall, Shrewsbury School; 52.70502°N 2.76584°W	—	1911	The school building is in red brick with a tile roof, two storeys and attics, and a front of twelve bays with gables. The windows are mullioned and transomed, there are canted bay windows, dormers, and a lunette.	II
St Michael's Parishioners' War Memorial; 52.71794°N 2.74598°W	—	1921	The war memorial is in the churchyard of St Michael's Church. It is in limestone, and consists of a calvary in a Gothic arch set on a rectangular base and a plinth. On the cross are inscriptions, and on the base are a sculpted helmet and rifle, and the names of those lost in the First World War.	II
War Memorial, Shrewsbury School; 52.70249°N 2.76313°W	—	1924	The war memorial consists of a bronze figure by Arthur George Walker on a stone base and quadrant walls. On the base are inscriptions and a figure of Sir Philip Sidney. There is a curved flanking wall inscribed with the names of those lost in the Second World War.	II
The Royal Oak Public House; 52.71586°N 2.75347°W		Early 20th century	The public house has a lower storey in brick, the upper parts are timber framed, and the roof is tiled with coped gables. There are two storeys and attics, and three bays, the outer bays projecting and gabled. In the centre is a doorway with a four-centred arch, flanked by canted bay windows. The upper floor and attic contain casement windows, and there is a central dormer. The upper storey is jettied and has a moulded bressumer on moulded brackets.	II
Former Monkmoor School; 52.71193°N 2.73181°W		1929–30	An open air school converted into housing in 1999. It is in red brick on a blue brick plinth, with timber framing and plaster infill in the upper parts, and tile roofs. The plan consists of two rectangular courtyards surrounded by single-storey classrooms, and a central hall. At the entrance is a gabled block flanked by gabled pavilions, all with two storeys.	II
Telephone kiosk, Abbey Foregate; 52.70711°N 2.74134°W	—	1935	A K6 type telephone kiosk, designed by Giles Gilbert Scott. Constructed in cast iron with a square plan and a dome, it has three unperforated crowns in the top panels.	II
Telephone kiosk, Shrewsbury Abbey; 52.70741°N 2.74487°W		1935	A K6 type telephone kiosk, designed by Giles Gilbert Scott. Constructed in cast iron with a square plan and a dome, it has three unperforated crowns in the top panels.	II
St Winefride's Church, Monkmoor; 52.71082°N 2.72423°W		1956	A Roman Catholic church designed by Francis Xavier Velarde, it is built in brown brick with decoration in cast stone, and has concrete tile roofs. The church consists of a nave with an apsidal sanctuary, a narthex, a sacristy, and a confessional. Attached to the church is a square campanile with a former baptistery in the base.	II
Pillar box, Shrewsbury Abbey; 52.70735°N 2.74494°W		Undated	The pillar box dates from the Victorian era and is in cast iron. It has an octagonal plan, it is inscribed with "VR", and has a shallow cap with an acorn finial.	II

== See also ==
- Listed buildings in Shrewsbury (northwest central area)
- Listed buildings in Shrewsbury (southeast central area)

== See also ==
- Listed buildings in Shrewsbury (northwest central area)
- Listed buildings in Shrewsbury (southeast central area)
