= Shrewsbury Flaxmill Maltings =

Grade I listed former factory building in Shropshire, England

Shrewsbury Flaxmill Maltings Ditherington Flax Mill
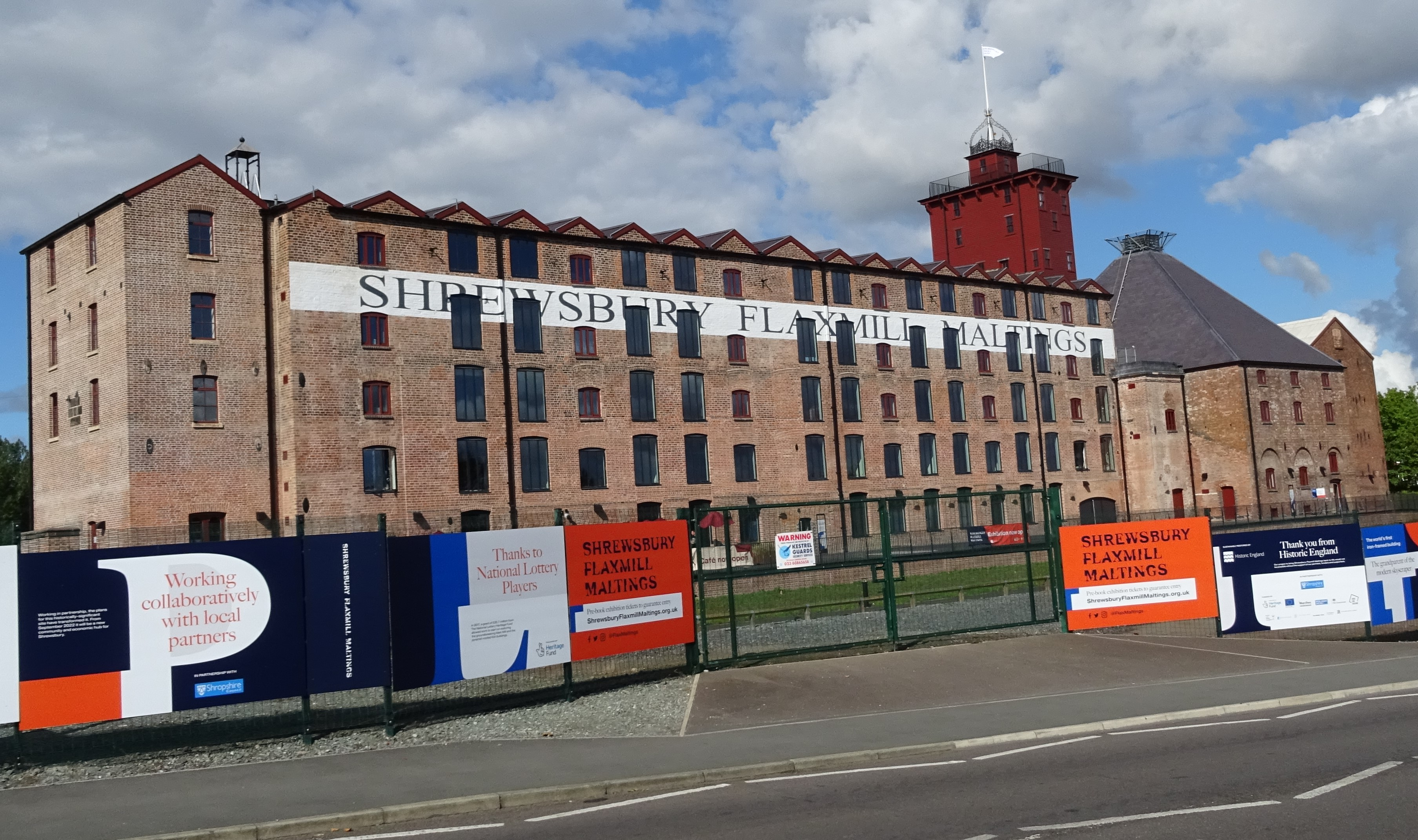
- East side of the Main Mill, facing St Michael's Street in September 2022

- Location within Shropshire
- 52°43′10″N 2°44′36″W
- Type: Flax mill, maltings, mixed use
- Location: Ditherington, Shrewsbury
- OS grid reference: SJ4986613818

History
- Built: 1797

Site notes
- Area: Shropshire
- Architect: Charles Bage
- Architectural style: Iron framed
- Owner: Historic England

Listed Building – Grade I
- Official name: Ditherington Flax Mill: Spinning Mill
- Designated: 10 January 1953
- Reference no.: 1270576

Shrewsbury Flaxmill Maltings (previously the Ditherington Flax Mill), is a flax mill located in Ditherington, a suburb of Shrewsbury, England. It was the first iron-framed building in the world and has been described as "the grandfather of skyscrapers". The mill is five-storeys tall. Its importance was recognised in the 1950s, resulting in it becoming a Grade I listed building. It is also locally known as the "Maltings" from its later use. The mill is owned by Historic England and is currently in use as a mixed-use workspace following its official opening in 2022. The complex has an exhibition managed by English Heritage.

== History ==
The Flax Mill's architect was Charles Bage, who designed the mill using an iron-framed structure, inspired by the work of William Strutt. The columns and cross-beams were made by William Hazledine at his foundry in Shrewsbury. The construction of the mill ran from 1796 to 1797, at a cost (including equipment) of £17,000. Over 1,000 people worked at the mill on mechanical looms powered by steam boilers that burned coal. In 1860, records showed that a third of the work force was under 16, some as young as 10, including orphans who worked in exchange for food.

The mill was built for John Marshall of Leeds, Thomas Benyon, and Benjamin Benyon. The architect, Bage, was also a partner in the venture. This partnership was dissolved in 1804, the mill being retained by John Marshall, who paid off his partners on the basis that it was worth £64,000. Castlefields Mill was built by the other partners nearby. These two flax mills provided the 'chief manufacture' of Shrewsbury (according to an 1851 directory). The mill closed in 1886, and was sold, together with a bleach yard at Hanwood, for £3,000. The building was then converted to a maltings (hence its more commonly used local name), and as a consequence many windows were bricked up.

Its design effectively overcame much of the problem of fire damage from flammable atmosphere, due to the air containing many fibres, by using a fireproof combination of cast iron columns and cast iron beams, a system which later developed into the modern steel frame which made skyscrapers possible.

The maltings closed in 1987, suffering competition with modern production methods, with the complex left derelict until its purchase by English Heritage with support from the Shrewsbury and Atcham Borough Council and Advantage West Midlands in 2005. Plans to transform the site into offices and shops were given approval in October 2010. Following the split of English Heritage in 2015 responsibility for statutory functions and protection of the site was inherited by Historic England with the visitor attractions managed by local charity Friends of the Flaxmill Maltings.

Following delays to restoration amid the Great Recession, a new visitor centre, partly funded by the Heritage Lottery Fund and the European Regional Development Fund, opened in November 2015 in the former office and stables block. Phase Two of the restoration works started in June 2017, involving the Main Mill and the Kiln with an extra grant of £7.9 million on top of the previous £12.1 million from the Heritage Lottery Fund for conversion into a mixed-use venue. This phase involved the restoration of the larger windows from the flax mill era to improve natural lighting, although the existing smaller windows from the maltings era have been retained but with the frames replaced.

The Main Mill was officially opened on 10 September 2022 as mixed-use workspace and public exhibition with a café and shop. It is hoped that the four remaining listed buildings (the Apprentice House, the Cross Mill, the Dye House and the Warehouse) will be restored in the coming years. In late September 2022, Friends of the Flaxmill Maltings announced their winding down as a charity and a company with the preference of Historic England for a company set up by themselves to take over operations.

In 2024, the mill was awarded the RIBA's accolade of West Midlands Building of the Year.

In January 2025, the mill's owners announced that the visitor centre would be managed by English Heritage from 1 April that year.

== Buildings in the group ==
Along with the main Flax Mill, a number of other buildings in the group are listed for their architectural and historic value: the apprentice house (Grade II*); the dye house (Grade II*); the flax dressing building or Cross Mill (Grade I); the flax warehouse (Grade I); the stables (Grade II); the malting kiln (Grade II) and the workshops and offices (Grade II). The remaining unrestored buildings are on the Heritage at Risk Register.

== Cultural references ==
Shrewsbury-born poet Jemma L. King grew up near the Flax Mill and, in 2025, published a poem titled "The Maltings" based on her recollections of the building, as part of her collection Moon Base One.

== Gallery ==
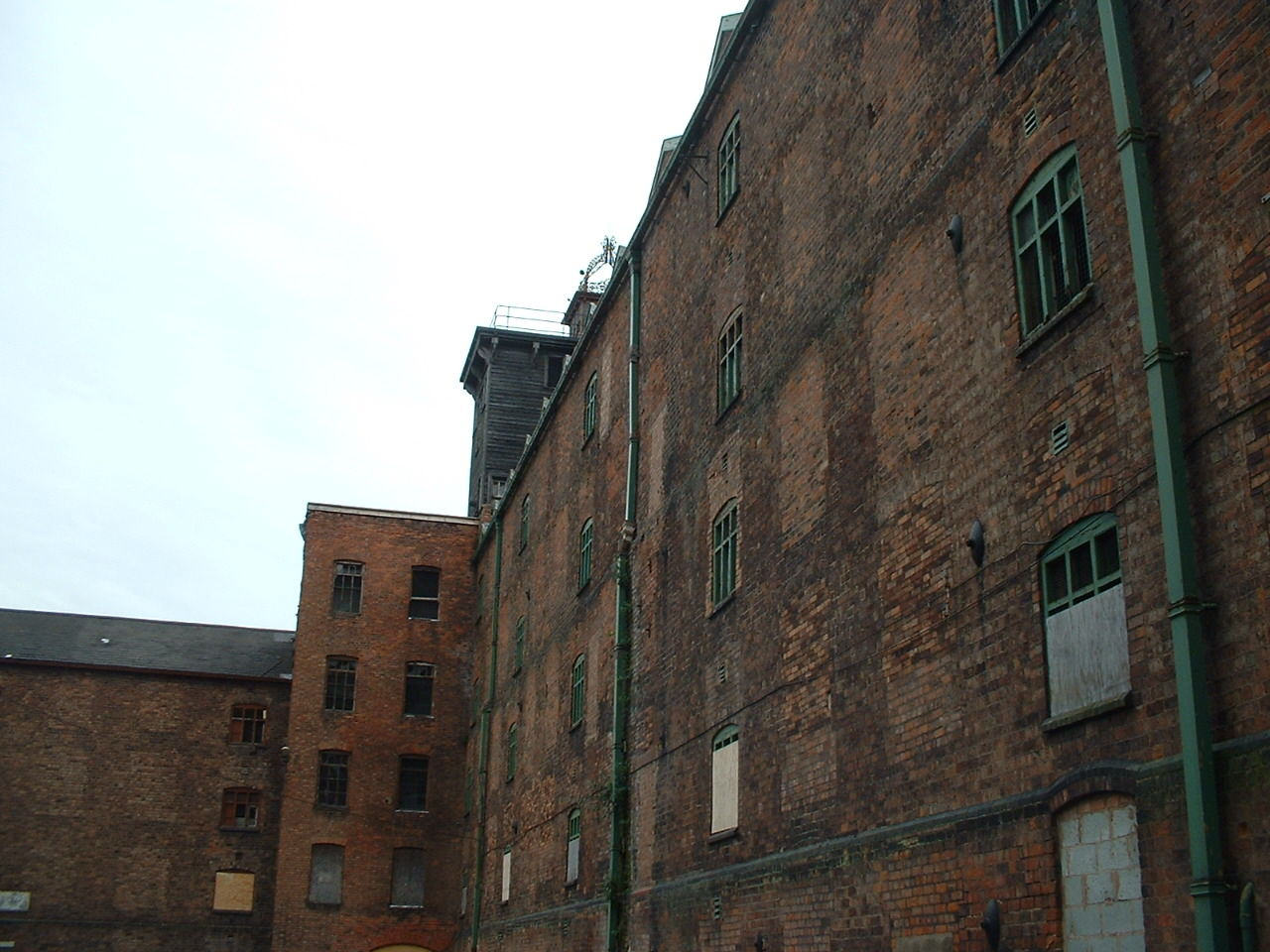
West side of the Main Mill c.2002 prior to restoration.

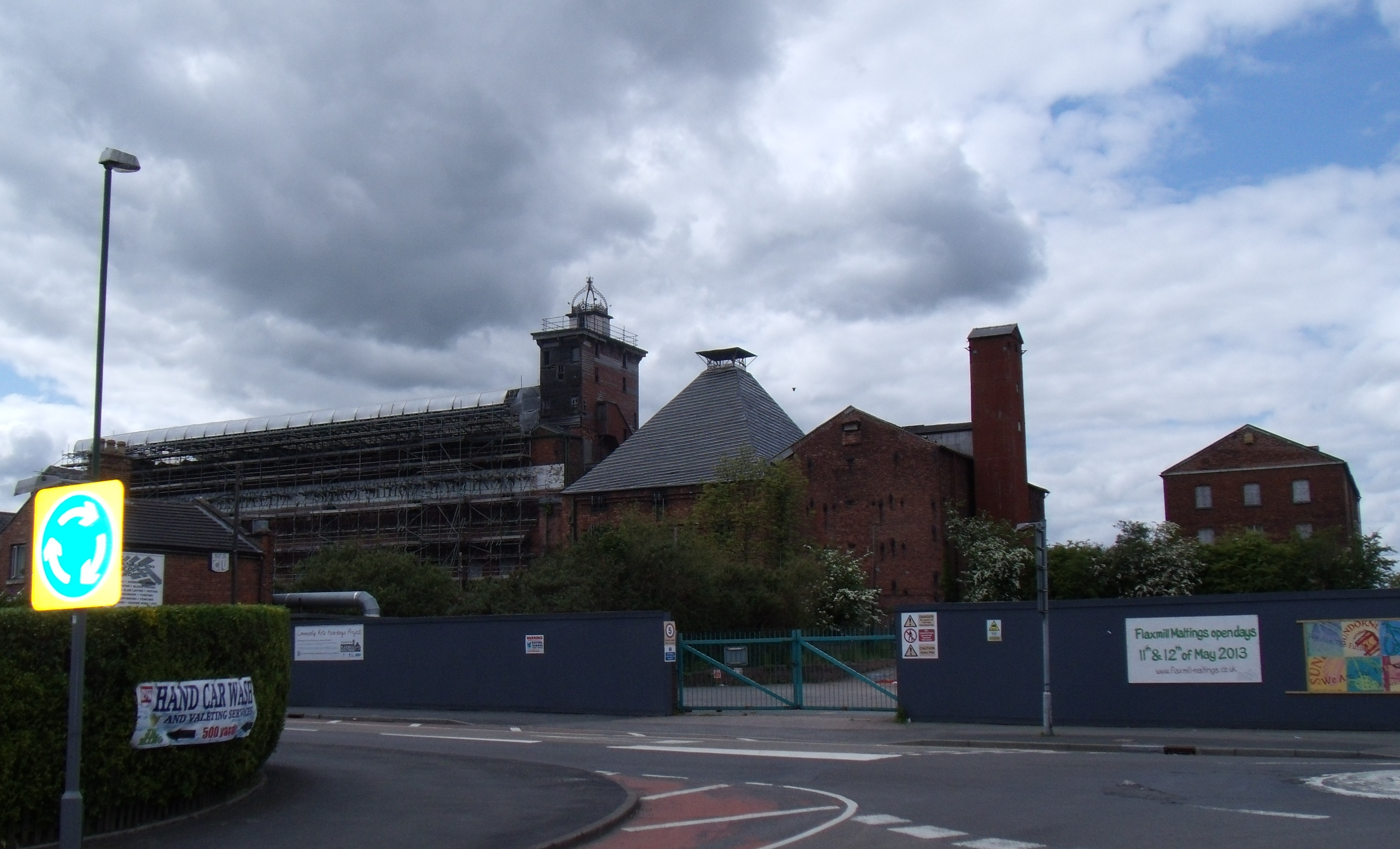
North-east side of the mill in June 2013 showing the scaffolding with white plastic sheeting for the restoration. Taken from the junction of St Michael's Street and Sultan Road.

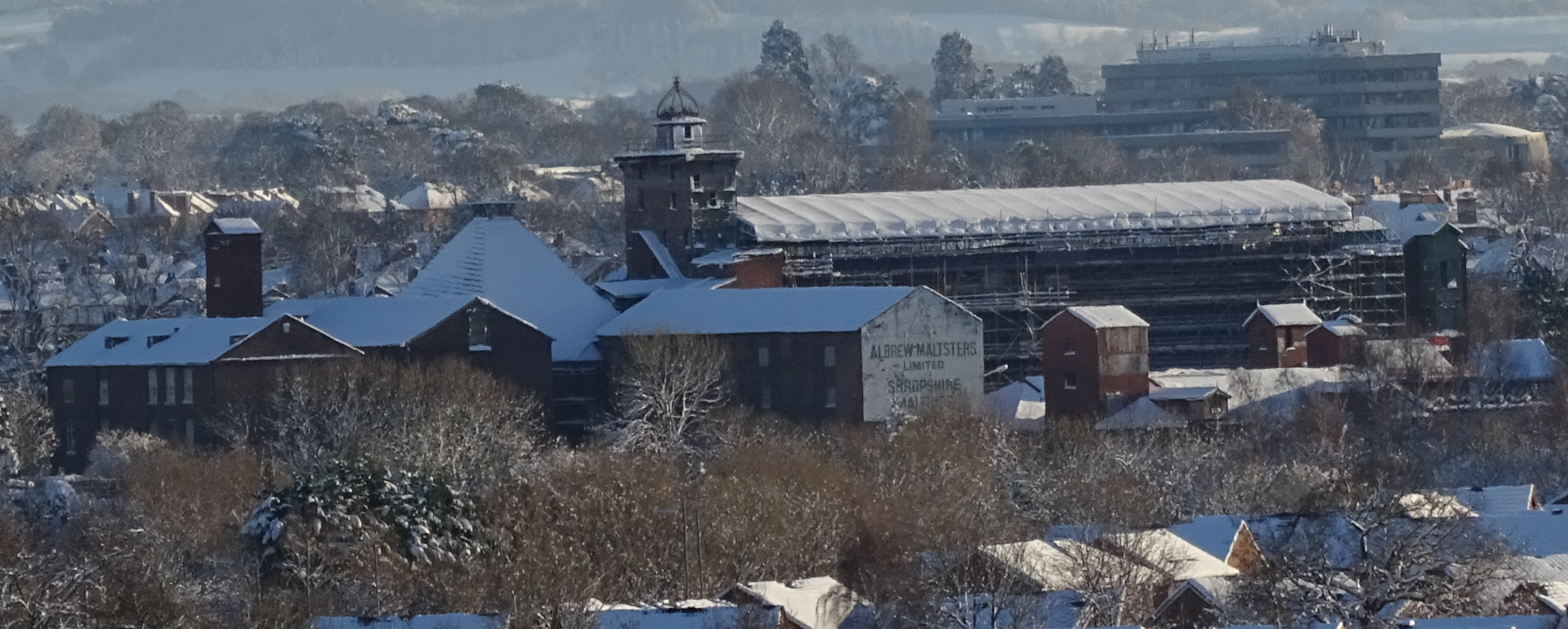
West side of the site in snow, December 2017. Taken from Hencote Lane, Shrewsbury.

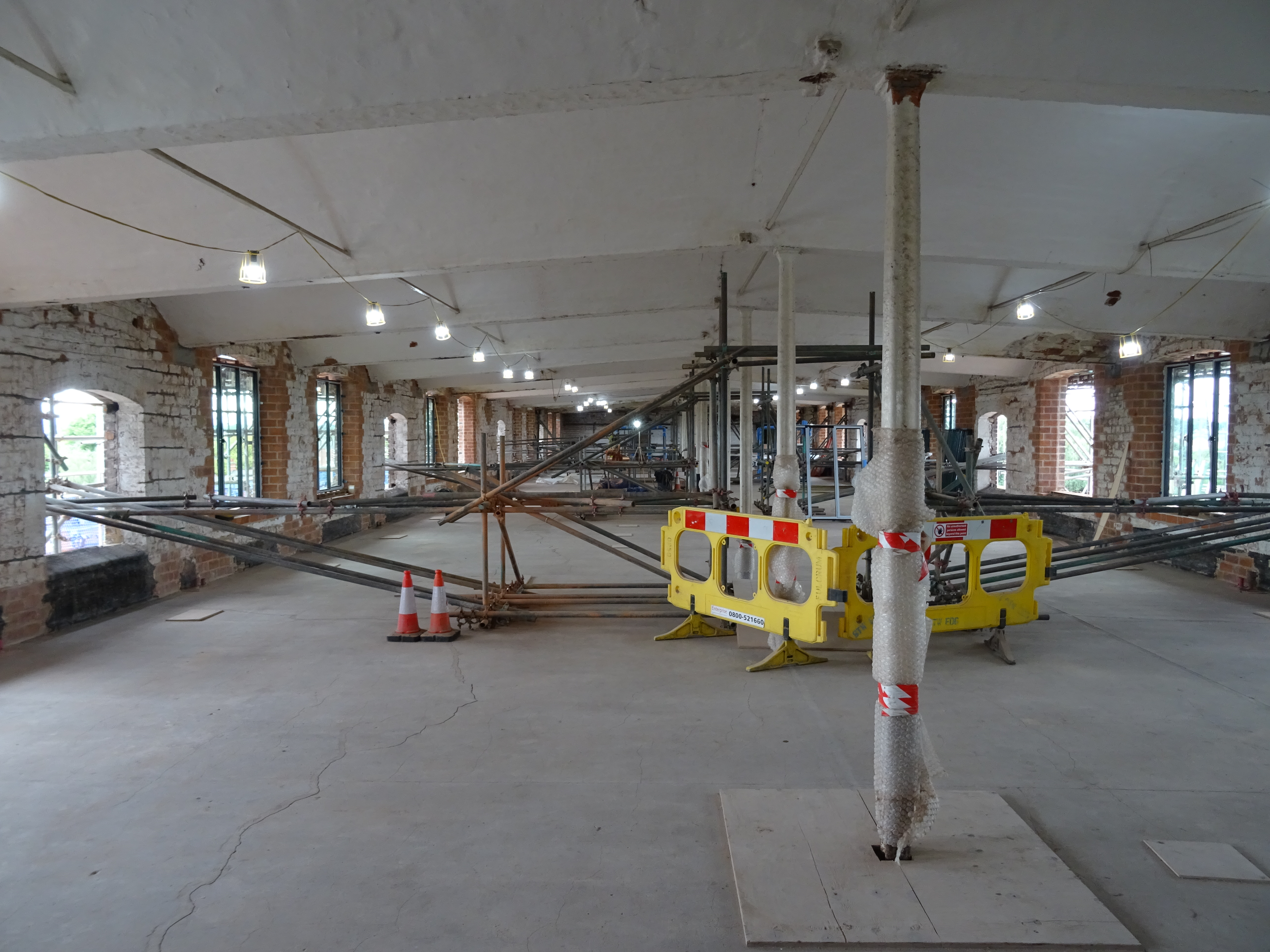
Restoration work on the top floor of the Main Mill in September 2018 with the work on the windows.

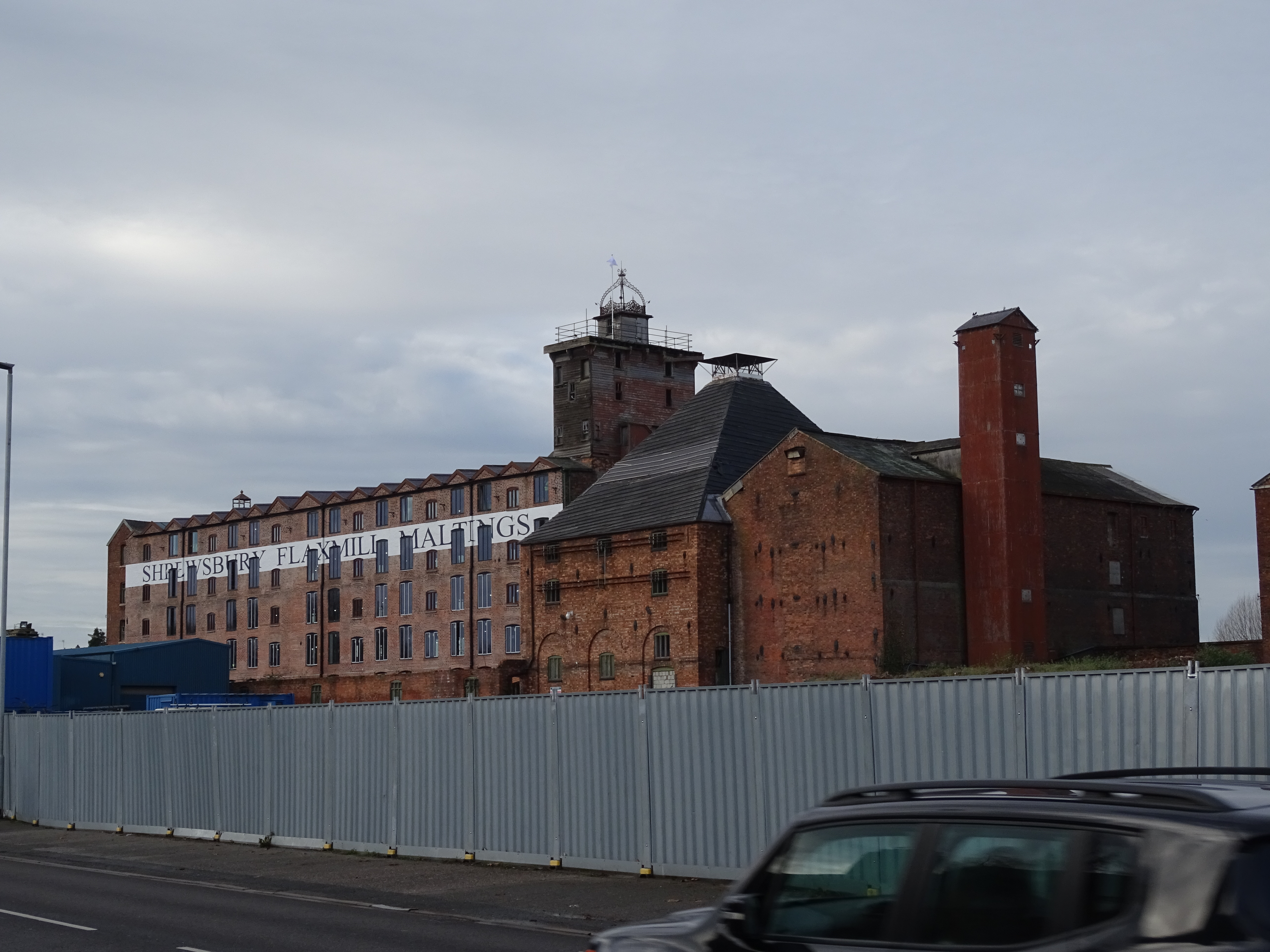
East side facing the junction of St Michael's Street and Sultan Road in December 2018 after the scaffolding was removed for the first time in about twelve years.

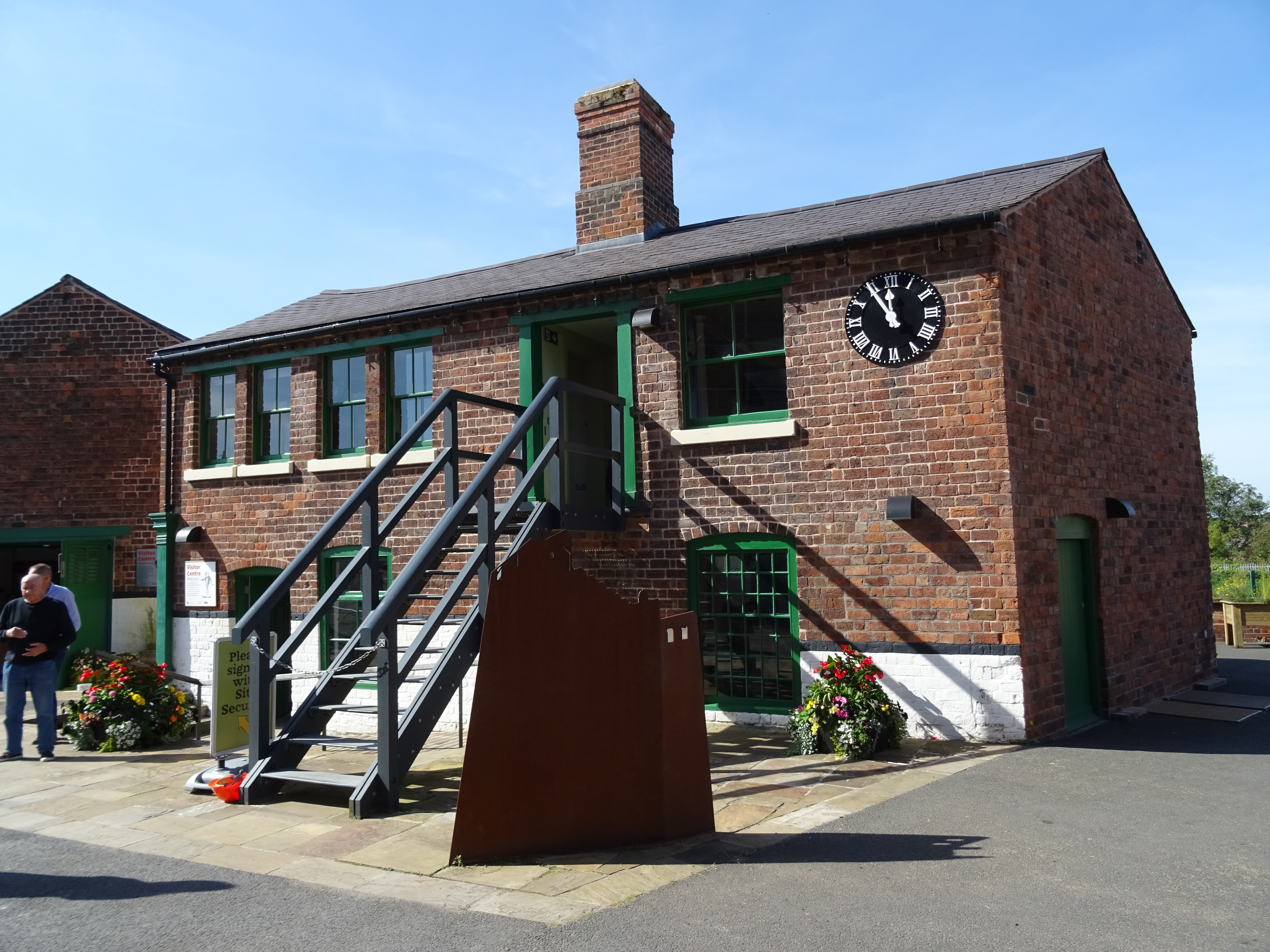
The previous visitor centre in the former office block (smithy in the flax mill era) in 2019.

== See also ==
- Listed buildings in Shrewsbury (outer areas)
