= Iron frame =

Use of iron in building

The term iron frame describes the structural use of either cast iron or wrought iron in the columns and beams of a building. While popular in the 19th century, the iron frame was displaced by the steel frame in the early 20th century.

== Cast iron ==
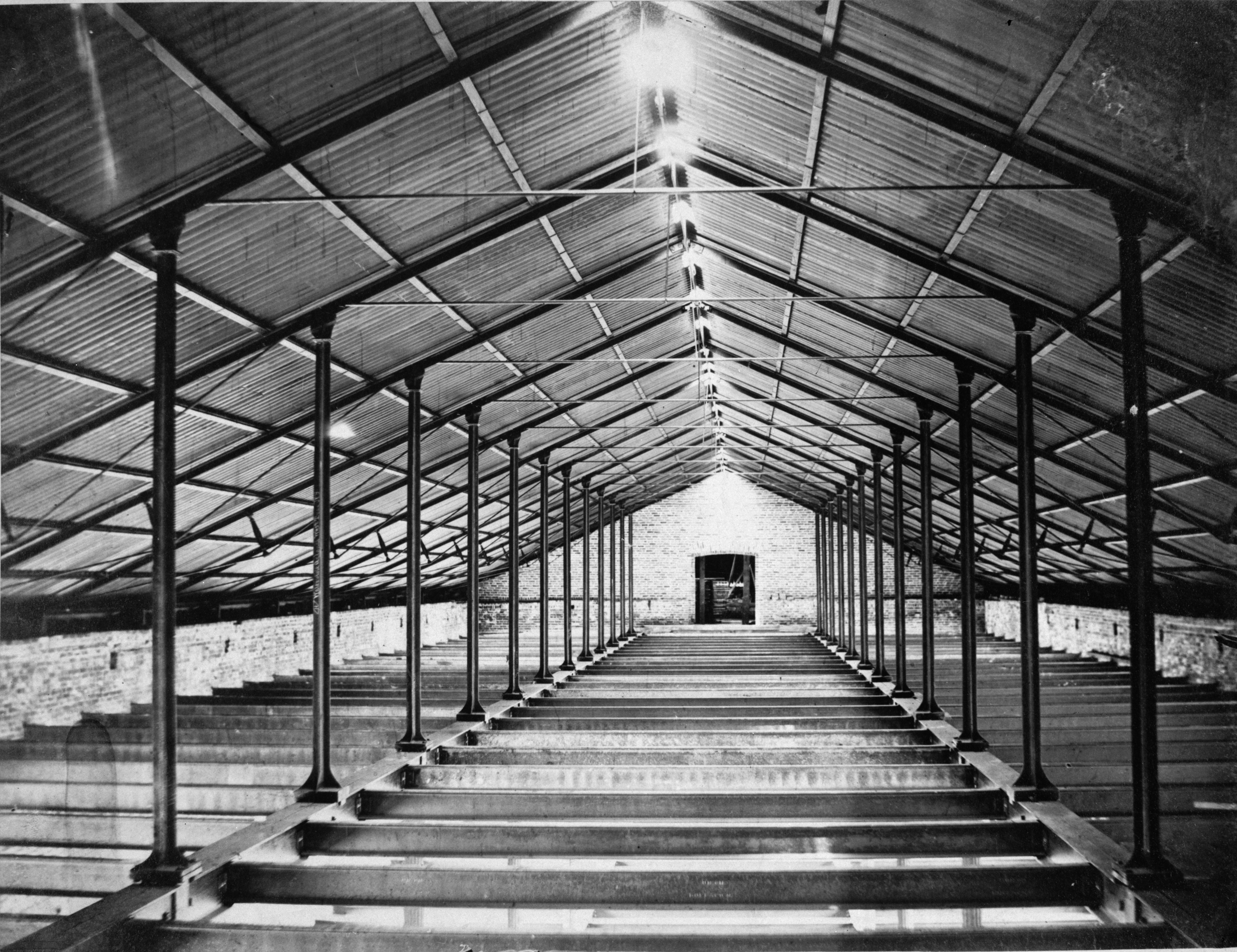
Cast iron frame in Watervliet Arsenal building 40 (c. 1840)

Columns made of cast iron were introduced in the 1770s, the first building with multiple storeys using cast iron for both columns and beams is the Ditherington Flax Mill in Shrewsbury (1797). Columns were joined usually at the floor level and sometimes bolted together, the longer beams were made of sections that were also kept together by bolts. At first, the stiffness of the frame was achieved through the use of masonry that filled the openings in the frame, but since 1844, a rigid frame was used that was stable by itself (former fire station at the Portsmouth Dockyard).

With its high compression strength, the cast iron is well-suited for columns. At first, the cruciform profile was used, later displaced by the hollow round shape and H-beams. Relative tensile weakness made the cast iron not the best choice for the beams and girders, this was compensated by making the bottom flange of an I-beam (the one experiencing the tension) much wider than the top, compressed, one and varying the beam profile to be wider at the middle, where the stress was higher. Cast iron was rapidly replaced in the beams by the wrought iron in the mid-19th century, the process had accelerated after the Dee Bridge disaster of 1847.

== Wrought iron ==
Use of wrought iron in construction has a long history (cramps made from wrought iron were used in classical antiquity). The first all-wrought iron roof was apparently installed in 1837 at the Euston railway station in London.

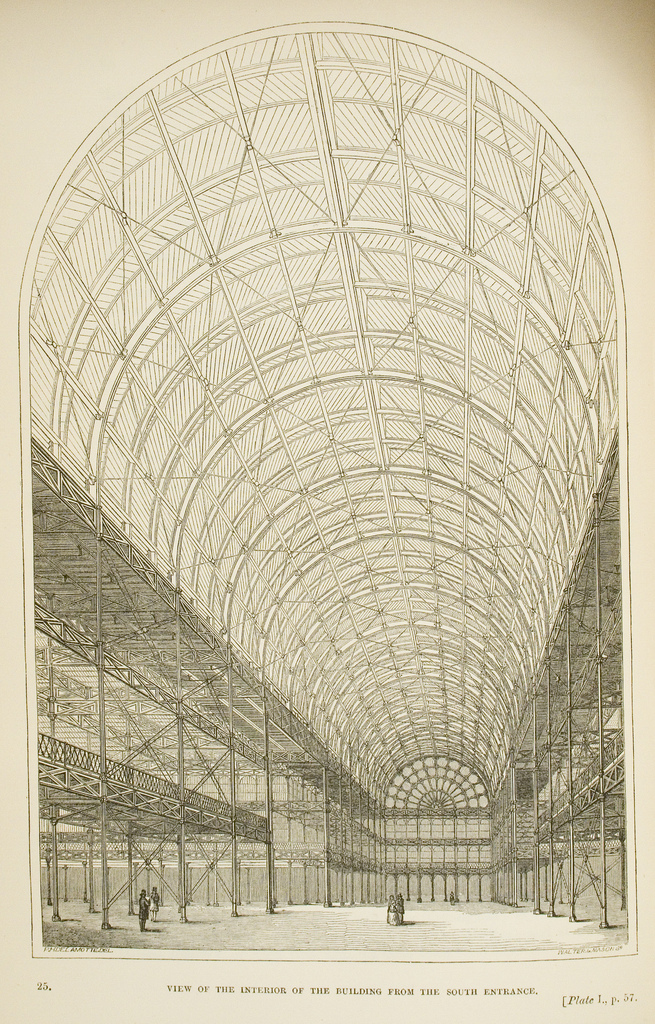
Frame of the Crystal Palace

Beams and girders were made of wrought iron with I-beam cross-section. The material was rarely used for the columns, as the cast was both stronger under compression and cheaper, so a typical iron frame building in the second half of the 19th century had cast iron columns and wrought iron beams. Columns at the Crystal Palace (1851), as well as short trusses, were made from the cast iron, while longer beams used wrought iron. A less-known precursor to the modern steel frame construction, the four-storey Boat Store ("Shed 78", 1858–1860), has its rigid frame constructed also from cast iron columns and wrought iron girders. With no internal walls and external walls made from sheet metal, the stability of this structure is provided exclusively through the rigid column-beam joints.
