= Charles Bage =

Charles Woolley Bage (1751–1822) was an English architect, born to a Quaker family in Derby, England. According to Malcolm Dick, Bage was the designer of the first recognised iron-framed mill in England, the Ditherington Flax Mill, located in the outskirts of Shrewsbury town centre, built between 1796 and 1797. According to the Friends of the Flaxmill Maltings, he not only built the first but also the 3rd and 8th iron-framed mill buildings in England. Ditherington Mill is a Grade I listed building. According to Historic England, "It is recognised as the first building in the world to successfully replace the timber beams and joists used in industrial buildings up to that date with incombustible materials, namely cast and wrought iron and brick".

== Life and career ==
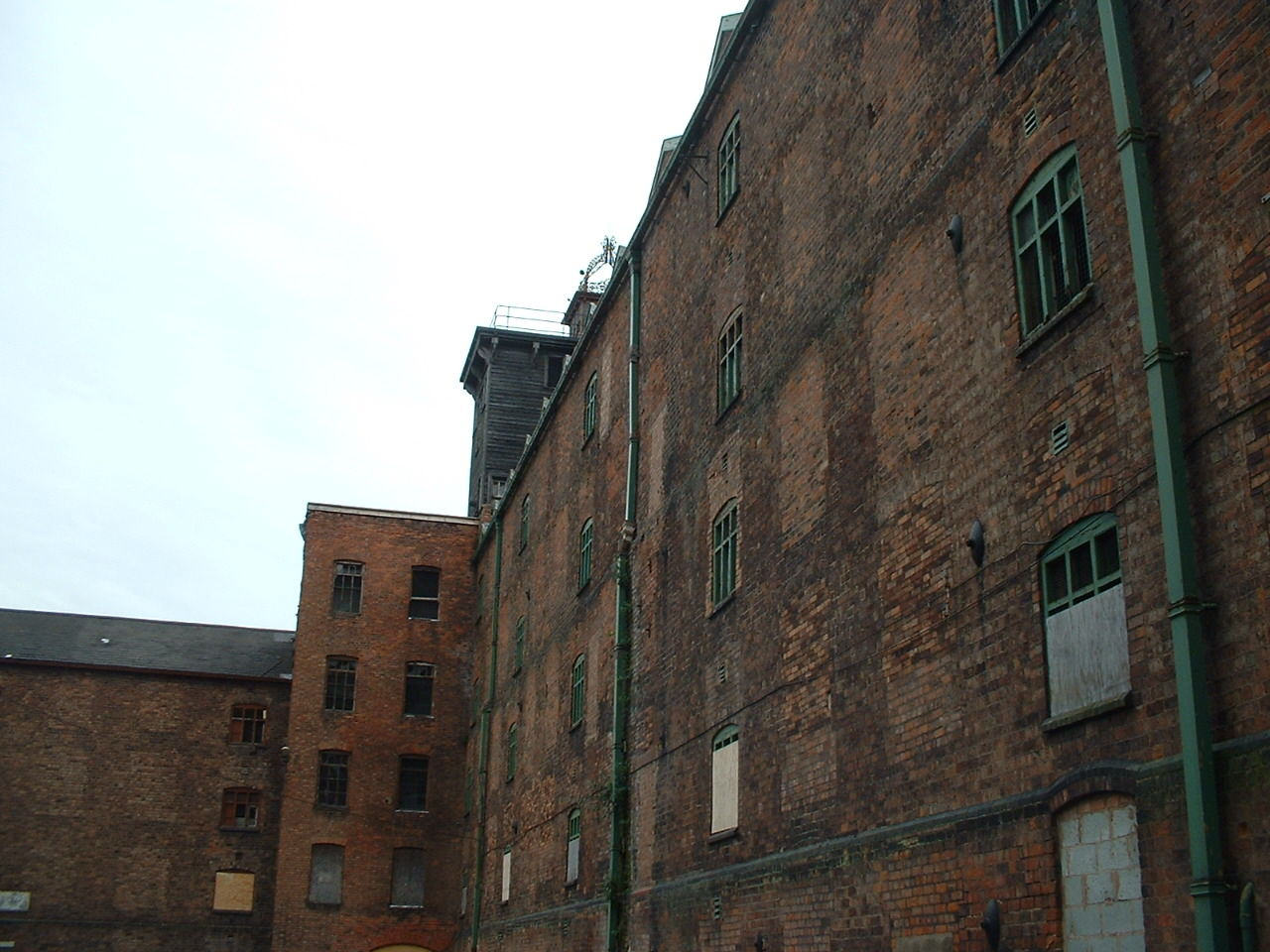
Ditherington Flax Mill

Shortly after Bage's birth, his family moved to Elford, Staffordshire, where his father founded a papermill, later becoming a partner in an ironworks. Throughout his life, Bage took an interest in the application of iron and gas technologies in construction and lighting, respectively. He was also a novelist.

By 1776, Bage was working as a wine merchant in Shrewsbury, and also as a surveyor, the latter being of interest to John Marshall and Thomas and Benjamin Benyon, who intended to develop mills in the town.

Bage had involvement in the local political affairs of Shrewsbury: he was in charge of the local workhouse from 1784 to 1787, and was mayor of Shrewsbury in 1807. The technology that Bage developed makes him one of the pioneers of what would become modern skyscraper technology.

== Legacy ==
"Bage Way", part of Shrewsbury's 20th-century inner ring road which links Old Potts Way to Crowmere Road, was named for him.
