= Wyver =

Coordinates: 53.036°N 1.489°W

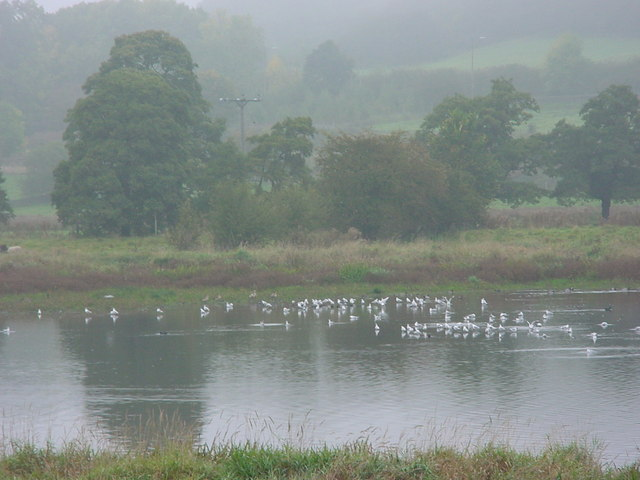
- Wyver Lane Nature Reserve

- Location within Derbyshire
- Interactive map of Wyver
- OS grid reference: SK342499
  - London: 120 mi (190 km) SE
- Civil parish: Belper
- District: Amber Valley
- Shire county: Derbyshire
- Region: East Midlands
- Country: England
- Sovereign state: United Kingdom
- Post town: BELPER
- Postcode district: DE56
- Police: Derbyshire
- Fire: Derbyshire
- Ambulance: East Midlands

Wyver is a locality within Belper civil parish, which is in the Amber Valley district of Derbyshire, England. The area takes up the western bank of the River Derwent just north of the former mills of Belper. Although overwhelmingly rural, the area has some notable associations within that industry and has been used for various activities throughout that time, and in recognition of these it has been made part of the wider UNESCO designated Derwent Valley Mills World Heritage Site.

== Geography ==
=== Location and extent ===
Wyver is surrounded by the following local places:

- Ambergate/Toadmoor to the north
- Bridgehill, Mount Pleasant and The Scotches is immediately to the south, alongside the town of Belper
- Broadholm to the east
- Belper Lane End to the west.

It is approximately 0.39 square miles (250 acres; 1.0 km^{2}) in area, 1 1/4 miles (2.0 km) in length and 2/3 mile (1.1 km) in width, to the north of Belper parish, central in the Erewash district, and is to the centre south in the county of Derbyshire. The area is roughly bounded by land features such as the Belper to Belper Lane End road to the west and south, the River Derwent and the Midland Main Line railway (Derwent Valley Line branch) are to the east, and the Belper parish boundary is to the north.

=== Environment ===
==== Landscape and ecology ====
The area is categorised within national biodiversity classifications as being within the Derbyshire lowlands and its Peak Fringe region, in local surveys it is known as the Wyver Acid Pastures due to its unimproved acid grassland. The wider parish has had several protected species visit and otters have been spotted in Wyver. From east to west, the area gently slopes upwards from its riverbank edge, and past Wyver Lane rises more steeply towards a hilltop near Belper Lane End. Much of the surrounding land is pasture or agricultural fields edged to the west by built development, with a few coppices including Wyver Wood to the north. Several footpaths lead into the area, primarily from Mount Pleasant, with other access from Belper Lane End and Alderwasley to the north. Only one paved route exists which is Wyver Lane, this is accessed via Mount Pleasant. The Wyver Lane Nature Reserve attracts many types of birds and landfowl.

==== Geology ====
Throughout much of the area surrounding the River Derwent, the bedrock consists of mudstones, siltstones and sandstones of Ashover Grit and Marsden formations, dating from 321–320 million years ago during the Carboniferous period. To the far north are sand and gravel deposits due to the geological feature known as the Allenton Terrace, which is the fluvial terrace of alluvium in the lower valley of the River Derwent that the area is built upon. The hilltop in the north west comprises Chatsworth grit made up of sandstone from the same era.

==== Hydrological features ====
The River Derwent forms nearly all the eastern edge of the area except for occasional incursions by the Midland Main Line in between meanders. Wyver Lane Nature Reserve is to the middle east of the area, it contains two shallow pools for migratory and wading birds. Wyver Lane Pond is a 2 acres (0.81 ha) members-only fishing pool to the south east.

==== Land elevation ====
Between Wyver Lane and the Derwent is low lying at 65 metres (213 ft). It then rises towards Belper Lane and Mount Pleasant, and most steeply to the north west by Wyver Wood, the peak height there being 167 metres (548 ft).

== History ==
=== Medieval to Victorian period ===
Any prehistoric history is obscure, and artefactual finds have not been recorded locally. Although Wyver was not described in the 1086 Domesday Survey commissioned by the king of the period William the Conqueror, land in the surrounding areas of the Derwent at Shottle and Bradley was held pre-conquest by Gamal and Siward respectively, and both afterwards by Henry de Ferrers. Bradley was an earlier name for the manor of Belper, and more widely was also used to refer to the Wyver region. In 1266, the estates of Robert de Ferrers, 6th Earl of Derby, a protagonist in the Second Barons' War, were confiscated by Henry III, and granted to his son the Earl of Leicester, known as Edmund Crouchback. From that period it remained in the hands of the Duchy of Lancaster which was a private holding of future monarchs, and became part of the Duffield Frith royal forest, within its Duffield (sometimes called Chevin) ward. The area was by medieval times in the Appletree hundred, within Duffield ancient parish and Belper chapelry. An early form of the Wyver name was first used in 1387 within documents of the estate, including Wybald(e)shagh and Wibald(e)shagh. The area remained occasionally referred to under this ownership through to the 17th century, and was considered during this period to be waste. In 1633, to maximise income to the Crown from unused royal forests, efforts were made to disafforest the Frith by means of land surveys, subsequent enclosure and the apportionment of plots to locals, although resistance from them due to concerns around the quantity and quality of the final plots caused Parliament to abandon the process and revert the Chevin ward to commons until 1786 when it was revisited and completed. From 1777 Jedediah Strutt, who was an associate of Richard Arkwright of Cromford Mill fame, began to purchase plots to develop cotton mills in Belper to the east of the Derwent, and also obtained land that controlled the river, including the Wyver area then being called Little Chevin. The Strutts country house, Bridge Hill was built in 1793–1795 and obtained stone from a number of local places, including Scotches quarry and others in Wyver. The Strutts dammed the River Derwent to help channel water to power the mill, and to avoid overflow, the riverbank alongside Wyver was raised. By the late 1820s, the family owned the vast majority of Wyver, except some land to the west and housing at the start of Wyver Lane. A windmill was in place during the 1800s along the lane, it is thought it was used to pump water from springs in the vicinity to Belper for residents. The North Midland Railway was built along the eastern edge of Wyver from 1838 and the line opened in 1840.

=== Wyver Lane ===
Wyver Lane is a relatively modern period road, being formed as an easier route from Belper to Alderwasley Hall (the seat of the Hurt family with the Strutts having business and family ties) and eventually connecting to Whitewells Lane in Alderwasley parish. The original road to Wyver Farm branched off Belper Lane, and was later linked to this new route. Wyver Lane as a private coach road was developed by the Strutt family (probably alongside Hurt and Arkwright), and followed the west bank of the river north of Belper. It is shown on an estate plan of 1828, and is labelled 'the old Bradley Road and Coach Road to Cromford; now changed'. It was labelled New Bradley Road in 1791 enclosure maps, Lawn Farm Road and by the turn of the 19th century was renamed Wyver Lane. Weir Lodge at the start of Wyver Lane may have functioned as a gatehouse, allowing access to the road. This road was documented in texts of the time: 'A good road exists at present up the Vale of the Derwent, from Duffield to Belper-bridge, from whence it would be very important to the public that a good road should be made up the west side of the river to Cromford, nearly along the line of a private carriage-way, between these places, belonging to Messrs. Strutts, Charles Hurt, and Richard Arkwright'. Later however, a more popular route was created in 1817 with the Belper to Matlock turnpike road to the east of the Derwent, the lane then going into some disuse. Wyver Lane itself also changed slightly over time, the route originally leading to Wyver Farm, but in the 20th century was the name of the road instead to Lawn Cottage.

=== Wyver Farm ===
This was explicitly mentioned in 1636 as a farm in Duchy of Lancaster records, although there are reports since the 14th century. The wider area was in the hands of numerous owners after 1791 enclosure activities, notable landowners including the Wards, Jodrells who were Lords of Belper manor, and the Hurt family of Alderwasley Hall, it gave the Strutts an opportunity to assure their labour needs and welfare of their workforce, and they systematically began to buy numerous plots of land, obtaining Wyver Farm in 1809 and having full ownership by 1818. It is unknown what state the farm was in by this time, although maps of the period indicate a more scattered farmstead with small buildings. At some stage the farm was rebuilt, becoming one of their model farms utilising notable building techniques such as fireproof ceiling and floors which was already in use at their mills, structured storage of cattle feed to allow efficient delivery, allowing feed such as grains, cereals or hay to be tipped into pits or carted into stores that allows access to the mixing room in the first floor above the cow byres. Another Strutt farm feature are the cow byres being well-ventilated. The core portion of the farm is within an L-shaped grouping recessed into the hillside, while a western range holds a stable block with stone floor and feed storage areas. A further range of buildings comprised a stable, wagon lodge and barn which is also constructed of stone and has a slate roof. Other subsidiary buildings are a cow-house, hen houses, piggeries and small stable. The produce would be used to supply the Strutt's workforce.

=== Lawn Cottage ===
The area in the far north east was known in antiquity as part of a parkland called Bradley Laund with indications of being a farmstead since the 15th century. An old route called Wyver Street Moor leading to a ford at the Derwent ran close by in medieval times. Invariably, the farm was known under various titles as Highe Mill in 1681, Milley Laund House, Millhay Lawn and Lawn Cottage by the late 19th century. It was owned by the Ward family who were descended from the Bradleys, and there were relations to the Strutts. In the late 18th century, changes done to the Derwent river to improve the Strutt's mills output including the riverbank being raised adversely affected ground to the north of the weir used to retain water, Due to continual effects from the river to this property, the Wards litigated against the Strutt family for damages and a settlement involving an exchange was done whereby the land and farm was sold to the Strutts in 1810 for payment. The land primarily associated to it was the floodplain east of Wyver Lane but some was pasture, a small channel in the area couldn't discharge into the river to help drain the area, so a pumping station was built. This drained the land and allowed farming to continue for some years. A portion of the land was also used as the Strutt's musketry range. Lawn Cottage was not however classed as a model farm like Wyver Farm and was run as a traditional agricultural operation. The riverside floodplains was owned by the family until 1960, when these were sold to the then Belper Urban District Council. The cottage was sold at a later stage due to legal ownership dispute. Ownership of both eventually came under the succeeding authority Amber Valley District Council. It was sold in 2012 to a housing co-operative community and refurbished.

=== Musketry Range ===
The Strutt family organised a private militia in the late 18th century, the Belper Volunteer Battalion which protected the mills, in case of attacks from Luddites, and even invasion, in an era of Napoleon Bonaparte and regional instability. In 1800, a firing range was provided for them on Chevin Hill south of Wyver. New rifle technology had made the range inadequate by the end of the 19th century, and the force by this time had been travelling to Derby each week, to use a more suitable range. In 1899, the Strutts decided that travelling to Derby was too inconvenient and offered to arrange for a larger range. The family provided the land south of Lawn Cottage which may have been in use previously for practice, and paid to have a local resident's cottage removed so that a target wall and formal range could be constructed. They also arranged facilities to allow the range to pass a government inspection including a munitions store, which was completed by April 1899. The Wyver Lane range was enlarged several times up to 1948 and is one of the largest in England. It was used in the training of troops during the early stages of World War I (1914–18) and was still in use by the Territorial Army until the 1970s. The old firing range can still be seen at the bottom of the lane; several buttresses are still visible – one is the island on the left-hand side of the main pool, another is barely visible on the right-hand side of the main pool, and others have now almost disappeared. The furthest buttress (west of Wyver Lane but in Alderwasley parish) was angled to face southeast to achieve a 1000 yards position, which was the effective range of a military rifle by the end of the 19th century. Shorter distances were marked at 800, 600, 300, 200 and 100 yards. The rise of the land behind the main buttress helped to contain bullets, although Whitewells Lane would be closed during sessions. To the left of the viewing mound is an old metal gatepost that was used by the Territorials: if there was a green flag on the gate it was safe to go through. If a red flag, then it wasn't. A little further down the lane is a bricked-up hut on the left-hand side, this is the former ammunition store. Because the reservists did not want water on the land they used to pump it into the river. The pumphouse is the brick building at the southern end of the reserve with the protruding pipe.

== Conservation and leisure ==
=== Wyver Lane Nature Reserve ===
Map of Wyver Nature reserve

After the forces decommissioned the firing range, local authorities used it for landfill purposes from 1960 to 1982. The accumulations pushed water further up, creating bigger pools. As with most tips, it began to attract gulls, including visits from Iceland and glaucous gulls. The previous pumping of water from the land was stopped, which over time reverted the land to its wetland state which helped to diversify the bird population. Recognising the habitat and species within the area, the land was leased in 1990 by the district council and later landowners to a countywide interest group, the Derbyshire Wildlife Trust who now manage it as a local nature reserve also known as Wyver Lane Pool Reserve, becoming regarded as one of Derbyshire’s most important wetland locations and one of the few remaining areas of wet grassland in the Derwent valley. The reserve occupies 19 acres (7.7 ha; 0.030 sq mi; 0.077 km^{2}) and comprises two pools surrounded by water meadows and reed beds. Local bird observers still sometimes pump out water into the river to keep the pools low to attract waders. Levels are now controlled by a sluice at the southern end of the main pool. There is also a pipe from the main pool to the river which is stopped up during winter to maintain the water levels for wintering wildfowl. In spring it is opened up; if there is a dry summer it should be low enough to attract waders in late summer or autumn.

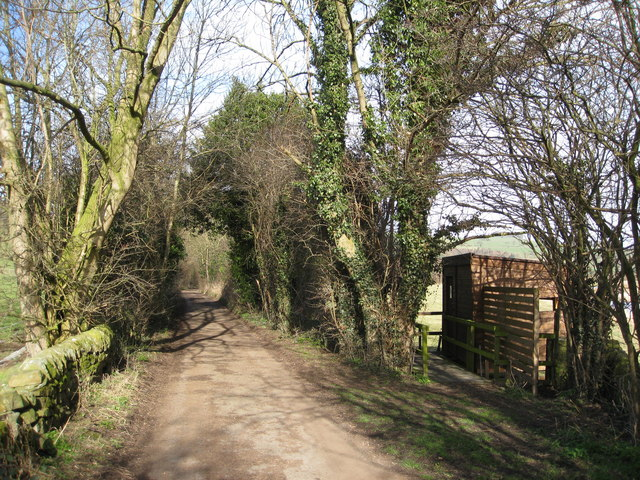
Wyver Lane and bird hide

To ensure that the many bird species continue to thrive there, there is no access onto the reserve, but there is a bird hide and viewing mound along Wyver Lane to enable observations. The many resident types of birds include tufted ducks, Canada geese and grebes, while in spring waders such as curlew and common sandpiper during migration pass through, and lapwings breed at this time. In summer there are swallows, house martins, and swifts, while nearby coppices provide an environment for firecrests, pied flycatchers, spotted flycatchers, crossbills, stonechats, and hawfinches. In winter, large flocks of black-headed, common, herring, lesser, and great black-backed gulls arrive from northern breeding grounds joined by ducks and other waterfowl including wigeon, goosanders, mallards, teal, and oystercatchers to roost and feed. Rarely seen birds such as water rails, jack snipes and bitterns have been spotted throughout the reedbeds.

=== Wyver Lane Pond ===
The feature is to the south of the nature reserve and accessed via a private lane and car park, covering 2 acres (0.81 ha). It was owned by the Strutts in the 19th century and shown on various maps of the period including estate plans. Fishing rights for this and stretches of the Derwent were leased to the Belper and District Angling Society, who were first established in 1892. The pond was sold on to the group in the late 1970s.

=== Derwent Valley Mills World Heritage Site ===
In 2001 the Derwent Valley Mills World Heritage Site was ratified by UNESCO, an agency of the United Nations, to internationally recognise the contributions of the cotton mills area between Cromford and Derby to the Industrial Revolution. The Wyver rural area along with Wyver Farm, Lawn Cottage, Wyver Nature Reserve and listed buildings at the start of Wyver Lane were included, in acknowledgement of their part to the Strutt Mill complex and their industry. A single field north of Lawn Cottage was placed outside the designated site, but lies within a surrounding heritage buffer zone. The overall site is overseen by a body, the Derwent Valley Trust.

=== Derwent Valley Heritage Way and Cycleway ===
The Heritage Way is a long-distance footpath designated by the Derwent Valley Trust and running through much of the World Heritage site. The Cycleway is a long-distance route for cycling currently being proposed by the trust. At Wyver, the way is overlain onto Wyver Lane, which then branches off through fields to Whitewells Lane in Alderwasley parish. In 2020, the trust resurfaced the first section of Wyver Lane, creating a local cycleway segment.

=== Other activities ===
An archery club is based in woods which are in Alderwasley parish, and accessed by means of Wyver Lane.

=== Listed buildings ===
At Wyver Farm there are a number of listed buildings. Features include the main farmhouse, barns and outhouses.

A terrace of three stone houses and other standalone residences exist at the start of Wyver Lane in the Scotches area.
