= George Strutt =

George Strutt may refer to:

- George Henry Strutt (1826–1895), English cotton manufacturer and philanthropist
- George Herbert Strutt (1854–1928), English cotton mill owner and philanthropist
