= Glensanda =

Coordinates: 56.563°N 5.543°W

- Location within the Lochaber area
  - Edinburgh: 190 mi or 310 km (road) (149 mi or 240 km via Corran Ferry)
  - London: 567 mi or 912 km (road) (526 mi or 847 km via Corran Ferry)
- Civil parish: Ardgour
- Council area: Highland
- Lieutenancy area: Inverness
- Country: Scotland
- Sovereign state: United Kingdom
- Dialling code: 01631
- Police: Scotland
- Fire: Scottish
- Ambulance: Scottish
- UK Parliament: Ross, Skye and Lochaber
- Scottish Parliament: Inverness East, Nairn and Lochaber

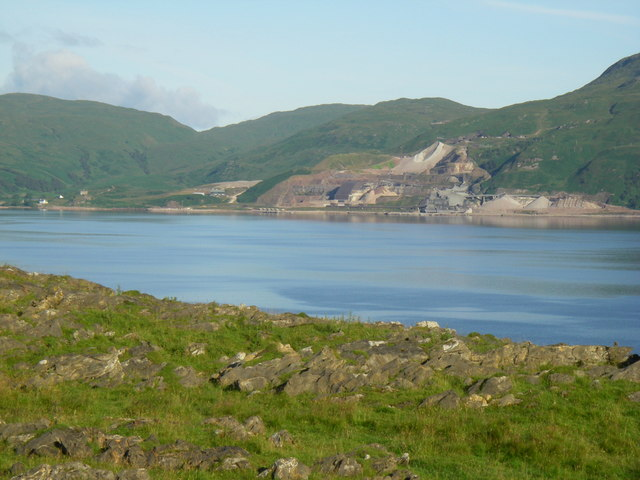
Glensanda from Glas Dhruim on Lismore, with Loch Linnhe in the foreground, looking WSW.

Glensanda (Old Norse, the glen of the sandy river) was a Viking settlement at the mouth of Glen Sanda on the Morvern peninsula within south west Lochaber, overlooking the island of Lismore and Loch Linnhe in the western Highlands of Scotland.

Glensanda Castle (Caisteal Na Gruagaich (Maiden's Castle); overlooks the mouth of the Glensanda River which tumbles down 400 metres along its 5-mile (8-kilometre) course from 'Caol Bheinn' into Loch Linnhe. The castle was the main base of the Macleans of Kingairloch (Kingerloch) since the 15th century, but the population fell from 500 to zero after 1812 when they emigrated to Pictou, Nova Scotia.

The remoteness of the Glensanda settlement is such that there are no road, rail, or marked footway links across the granite mountain, moor, heather and peat bog of the private Glensanda estate. The only practical access is by boat from the shores of Loch Linnhe.

Since 1982 the 2,400-hectare (5,900-acre) Glensanda Estate has been the home of the Glensanda Superquarry created by Foster Yeoman, since acquired by the Aggregate Industries group, which mines the Meall na h-Easaiche mountain, shipping up to 6,000,000 tons of granite aggregates all over the world annually, and with reserves for up to 100 years. To minimise visual impact from the coast the quarry is sited 1 mi (2 km) inland, and cut down into the mountain 1,600 ft (500 m) above sea level. Granite is extracted via a "Glory Hole" and conveyor belt, a pioneering development in alternative quarrying technology.

== History ==
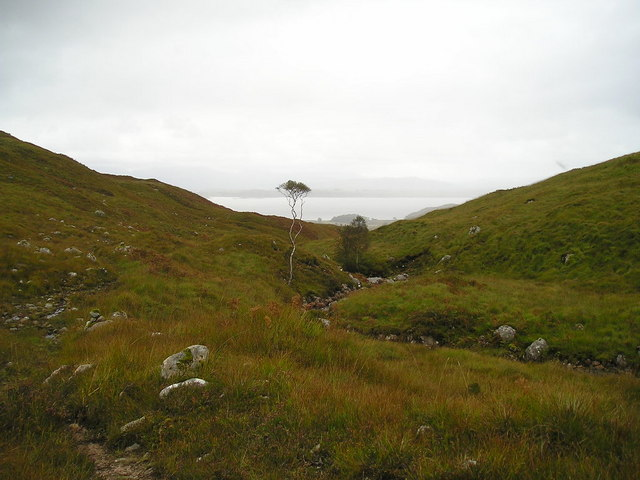
River Sanda and footpath to Ardtornish

Little is known of the glen before the Viking age when it was part of Dál Riata, a Gaelic over-kingdom of the western seaboard of Scotland, in the late 6th and early 7th century. According to Professor William J. Watson the Morvern district was formerly known as Kinelvadon, from the Cenél Báetáin, a subdivision of the Cenél Loairn.

Glensanda was a Viking settlement at the mouth of Glen Sanda The Vikings are thought to have led their first raids on what is now modern Scotland by the early 8th century AD. Their first known attack was on the holy island of Iona in 794, 40 mi (60 km) west. The end of the Viking Age proper in Scotland is generally considered to be in 1266.

Glensanda Castle is variously known as Caisteal Na Gruagaich (Maiden's castle), Castle Na'gair, Castle-en-Coer, Castle Mearnaig. It was built in the late 15th century by Ewen MacLean, 5th of Kingairloch, who was born circa 1450. Glensanda, a part of Ardgour, has formed part of the territory of the Clan MacLean ever since the Clan MacMaster was removed from the territory in the 15th century. The castle was the main base of the Clan Maclean of Kingairloch (Kingerloch), and supported a thriving community of circa 500 people until around 1780 when they seem to have moved 5 mi (8 km) north to Connach (Kingairloch), at the head of Loch a' Choire (Loch Corry).

In the late 17th century the massacre of the MacDonald clansmen marked the point when the fortunes of the MacLean clan began to wane, and by 1691 the Campbells had gained possession of most of the MacLean estates. Clan Maclean participated in the Jacobite risings of 1745 to 1746, supporting the House of Stuart and the Jacobite cause. Many members of the clan were killed fighting at the Battle of Culloden. Many MacLeans dispersed to other countries such as Canada, the United States, Australia and New Zealand.

In 1812 Sir Hector Maclean (the 7th Baronet of Morvern and 23rd Chief of the Clan Maclean) emigrated with almost the entire population of 500 to Pictou, Nova Scotia, Canada. Thus, the Macleans appear not to have been involved in Highland Clearances. Sir Hector is buried in the cemetery at Pictou.

English landowner, James Forbes (1753–1829), of Hutton Hall, Essex, bought the estate from Sir Hector Maclean in 1812 and subsequently had the existing house at Connach extended to become the first Kingairloch House. James Forbes daughter Charlotte married Major-General Sir Charles Bruce, KCB to become Lady Bruce, and was the mother of Charlotte (1836–1906) the wife of Henry Campbell-Bannerman, Prime Minister of the United Kingdom.

In 1888 (or 1881) the estate was purchased by John Bell Sherriff, Esquire of Carronvale, a distiller and industrialist from Glasgow and Falkirk for £30,140.}

In 1902 George Herbert Strutt (1854–1928), a 5th generation cotton tycoon from Belper, Derbyshire, and descendant of Jedediah Strutt, bought the Glensanda and Kingairloch estates. In 1930 Arthur Strutt (1908–1977) married Patricia Kebbell (20 October 1911 – July 2000), daughter of a New Zealand sheep farmer, and granddaughter of John Cameron (a Scottish cattle drover from Corrychoillie, Spean Bridge), having been introduced by his sisters who were attending the same Swiss finishing school. Arthur Strutt died on the estate in 1977 although his body was not found for five years. Mrs Strutt was a renowned stag hunter, having shot circa 2,000 between 1930 and her death, more than any other woman in Great Britain.

The final solitary resident of Glensanda died around the 1950s. By the 1980s Glensanda comprised the ruined tower of the 15th-century castle, a couple of derelict cottages, and a wrecked cattle shed. It was known as "the Larder of Lorne" to poachers of red deer and salmon.

John Yeoman and his wife Angela of Foster Yeoman bought the Glensanda estate from Mrs Strutt in 1982, and the Kingairloch estate in 1989, but she retained the hunting rights of both estates.

In 2006 Foster Yeoman was wholly acquired by the Holcim Group and is now part of its Aggregate Industries subsidiary and is no longer family owned.

== Glensanda Super Quarry ==
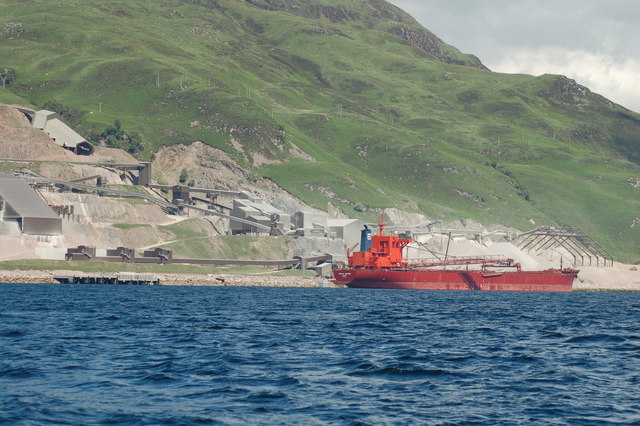
Glensanda quarry jetty, Loch Linnhe

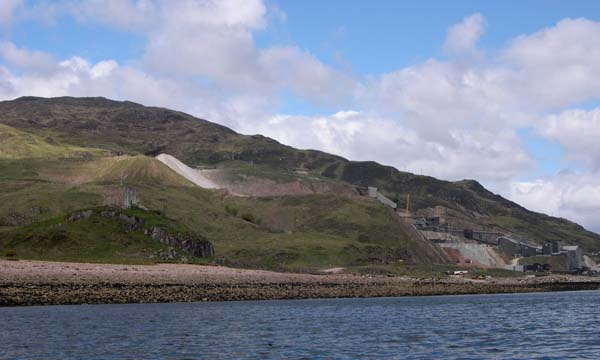
The quarry

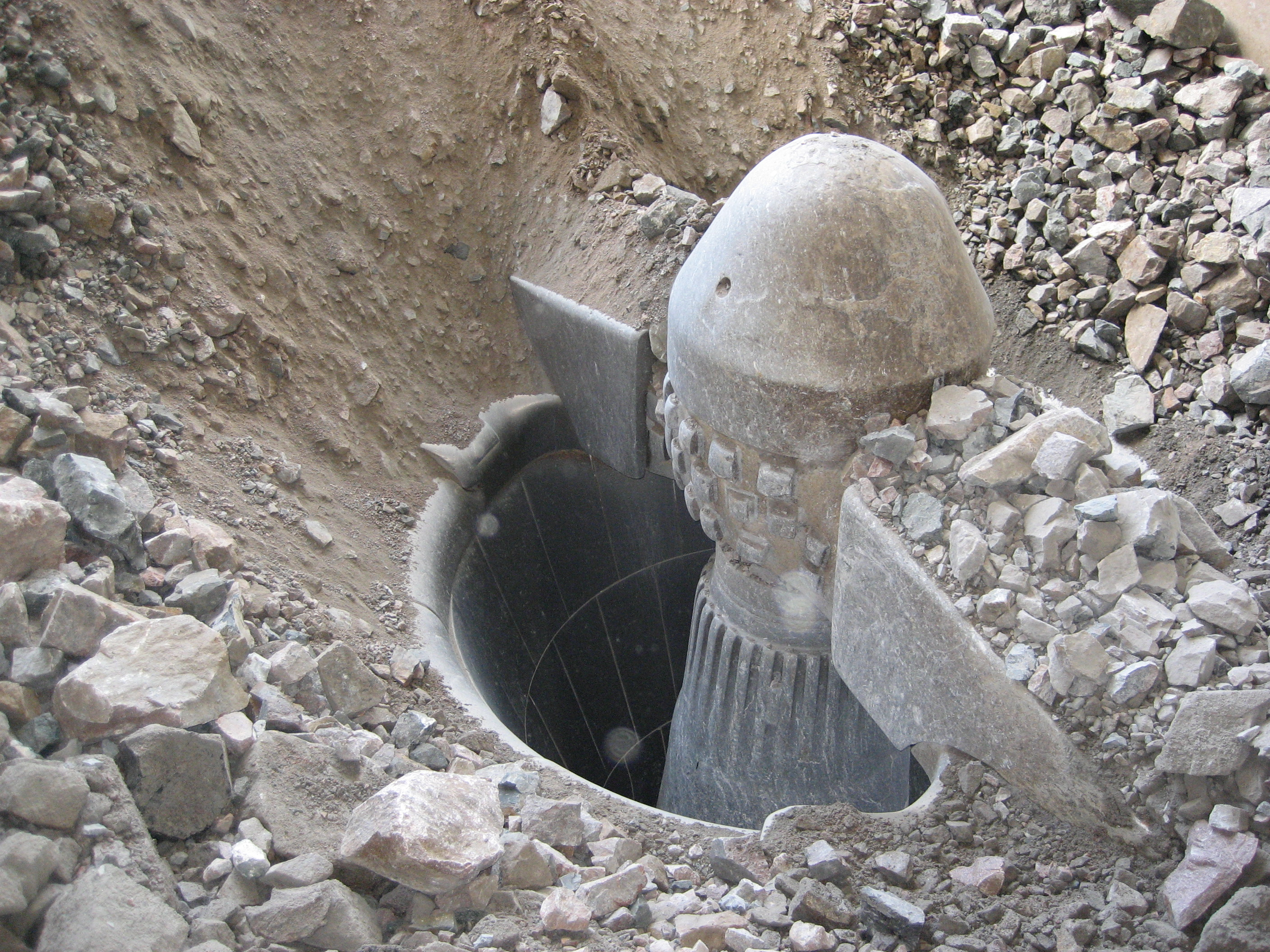
Top of the Gloryhole

In 1976 the UK Government commissioned Sir Ralph Verney to analyse the shortage of aggregates for building. The resulting "Verney report" led John Yeoman, Chairman of Foster Yeoman, to the idea of a super-quarry situated in a remote location from which stone could be exported by sea. To this end in 1982 he bought the 2,400-hectare (5,900-acre) Glensanda estate in Argyll from Mrs Patricia Strutt who also owned the Kingairloch estate which she also sold to Foster Yeoman in 1989. Glensanda went into operation in 1986 when the first shipload of granite left for Houston, Texas, USA. In June 1989, extractions began using the "glory hole" and conveyor belt method.

To minimise visual impact from the coast the quarry is sited 1 mi (1.6 km) inland, and cut down into the mountain 1,600 ft (500 m) above sea level. Each explosive blast dislodges about 70,000 tons of granite, which is transported by dump truck to the primary crusher, which reduces it to lumps no bigger than nine inches in diameter. It is then transferred by conveyor belt to a heap that covers the "glory hole", a 1,000 ft (300 m) vertical shaft 10 ft (3 m) in diameter, which is permanently full of rocks. At the base of the glory hole, deep inside the mountain, rocks are transferred to a horizontal conveyor and moved through a 1-mile-long (1.6 km) tunnel to the second crusher on the shore, where oceangoing ships are loaded in the deep-water docks at the rate of 6,000 tons per hour.

In 1998 there were approximately 160 employees either living on site or commuting by boat from Barcaldine, near Oban. Exports at that point were going to Amsterdam, Hamburg, Rostock and Świnoujście, in Poland, as well as the Isle of Grain in the Thames Estuary.

Reserves of granite are estimated to last at least until the year 2100, when the excavation will have created a new corrie 1 1/2 mi (2.4 km) square and 400 ft (120 m) deep.
