= Joseph Strutt =

Joseph Strutt may refer to:

- Joseph Strutt (engraver and antiquary) (1749–1802), English engraver and antiquary
- Joseph Strutt (philanthropist) (1765–1844), Derby textile manufacturer and philanthropist
- Joseph Strutt (MP) (1758–1845), British soldier and MP
