= Derbyshire Wildlife Trust =

Wildlife conservation charity

Derbyshire Wildlife Trust is one of 46 local UK Wildlife Trusts. The trust was founded in 1962 in response to environmental threats to the local countryside, and is now based at East Mill on the River Derwent in the town of Belper, Derbyshire. It is a registered charity (number 222212), with around 14,000 members.

Derbyshire Wildlife Trust currently manages over 50 nature reserves, covering various habitat types. Sixteen of these are Sites of Special Scientific Interest (SSSIs), providing community training, activities, and environmental education. The trust also provides ecological surveys, advice and data to landowners and organisations. Environmental education and workshops are provided at the Whistlestop Centre in Matlock Bath, and the Wildlife Discovery Room at Carsington Water.

== History ==
The organisation was founded in 1962 as Derbyshire Naturalists' Trust by a group of concerned people, in order to oppose plans to tip fly ash at Ticknall Limeyards in South Derbyshire. Backed by national pressure, the campaign was successful and led to the formation of an official local charitable organisation to handle such issues.

By 1967, the trust had established two nature reserves, one of them at Ticknall Limeyards itself. The other, a Site of Special Scientific Interest (SSSI) at Morley Brickyards, was leased to the trust by its owner and is still being managed as a nature reserve. The trust also acquired Overdale, the first nature reserve that it owned outright. The 15-hectare (37-acre) of upland pasture were donated by Portland Cement to mark European Conservation Year. A bequest allowed the trust to appoint its first member of staff in 1973.

As the trust grew it was able to campaign more effectively, and in 1984 featured in national headlines when it won a private prosecution against five men caught badger digging.

After rebranding as Derbyshire Wildlife Trust in 1986, the trust launched an appeal to raise £200,000 to renovate the old railway station buildings at Matlock Bath and create the Whistlestop Countryside Centre, an education facility in the old railway station buildings at Matlock Bath. A major Heritage Lottery Fund award enabled development of more nature reserves work and set up a Midweek Volunteer Team.

Since 2006, the trust has launched and developed a variety of projects aimed at protecting and raising awareness of vulnerable species and habitats. These include Derby Cathedral's Peregrines Project, Great Trees of Derbyshire and Saving the Great Trees of Derbyshire – projects which have raised awareness of the importance of ancient trees – and Water for Wildlife, which has helped to restore wetland habitats.

In 2007, the Avenue Washlands Nature Reserve near Chesterfield was opened and won first place in the conservation category for restoration sites in the British Trust for Ornithology's Business Bird Challenge. In the same year, a lottery grant allowed the trust to extend its educational programme with Grounds for a Change, transforming Derbyshire school grounds into wildlife havens and outdoor learning spaces. It also took over management of Drakelow Nature Reserve in the south of the county, an important wetland site playing host to over 200 species of birds.

In early 2024, Derbyshire Wildlife Trust purchased 34-hectare (83-acre) site Common Farm in Nether Heage to be managed as a nature reserve, following a successful fundraising campaign.

== Organisation ==
Derbyshire Wildlife Trust is governed by a board of trustees, and relies heavily on volunteer work for help with aspects such as managing nature reserves, administration, and education work, with around 500 active volunteers.

== List of nature reserves ==
- The Avenue Washlands
- Barton Pool
- Broadhurst Edge Wood
- Brockholes Wood SSSI
- Carr Vale
- Carvers Rocks SSSI
- Chee Dale SSSI
- Common Farm, Nether Heage
- Cramside Wood SSSI
- Cromford Canal LNR/SSSI
- Deep Dale and Topley Pike SSSI
- Derwentside
- Drakelow
- Duckmanton Railway Cutting SSSI
- Erewash Meadows
- Gang Mine
- Golden Brook Storage Lagoon
- Hadfields Quarry
- Hartington Meadows
- Hillbridge and Park Woods
- Hilton Gravel Pits SSSI
- Hoe Grange Quarry
- Hollinhill and Markland Grips
- Holly Wood
- Hopton Quarry SSSI
- Ladybower Wood SSSI
- Lea Wood
- Lock Lane Ash Tip
- Long Clough
- Mapperley Wood
- Miller's Dale Quarry SSSI
- Morley Brickyards SSSI
- North Wingfield
- Oakerthorpe LNR
- Overdale
- Priestcliffe Lees SSSI
- Risley Glebe
- Rose End Meadows
- Rowsley Sidings
- Spring Wood SSSI
- Watford Lodge LNR
- Willington Gravel Pits
- Woodside
- Wyver Lane

== Notable projects ==
=== Derby Cathedral Peregrine Watch Project ===
The Derby Cathedral Peregrine Project was launched in 2006, with the construction of a nesting platform for a pair of Peregrine falcons which had unsuccessfully bred at the cathedral for two consecutive years. Subsequent years have been successful, and the project began to include webcams, blogging, and viewing events set up for members of the public to be able to view the birds through telescopes.

=== Badger Vaccination Scheme ===
Derbyshire Wildlife Trust runs the largest badger vaccination project in the country, vaccinating over 1,700 badgers since 2014.

=== Bringing Back Beavers ===
The trust successfully reintroduced a pair of Eurasian beavers to Willington Wetlands in 2021. The pair subsequently bred in 2022; this was the first wild breeding pair in Derbyshire for around 800 years.
