= Eben William Robertson =

British historian

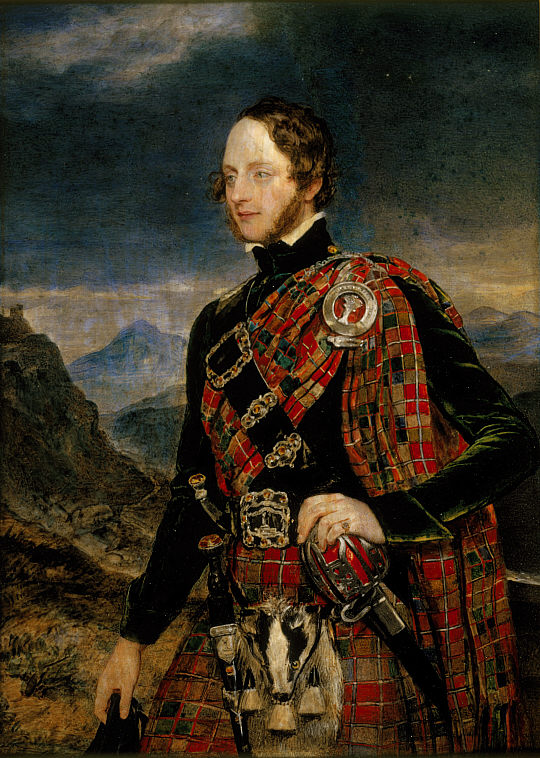
Eben William Robertson by Sir William Charles Ross.

Eben William Robertson (17 September 1815 – 3 June 1874) was a British historian.

== Life ==
Robertson was born near the Leicestershire- Derbyshire border at Netherseale, into a wealthy landowning family. He was a distant relative of 18th century Scots historian and academic William Robertson. He attended Worcester College, Oxford, and received legal training at Lincoln's Inn.

His father died in 1852 and Robertson succeeded to the family's estates. As a legally trained landowner and gentleman, he was active in local administration, first as a justice of the peace. In 1862, he was appointed Deputy Lord Lieutenant of Leicestershire, and in 1870, he became High Sheriff of Derbyshire. Robertson was married to Isabella Colgrave in 1838. They had one son and two daughters.

He is best remembered as a historian of medieval Scotland. His 1862 work Scotland under her early Kings (2 volumes) was well regarded. He published a collection of essays, Historical Essays in connexion with the Land, the Church, etc. in 1874.

In 1874 Robertson was injured attempting, unsuccessfully, to save his two nieces from a fire. Soon after he caught cold and died after a painful illness.

Honorary titles
Preceded by George Henry Strutt	High Sheriff of Derbyshire; 1870	Succeeded by Charles Rowland Palmer Morewood
