= George Henry Strutt =

English cotton manufacturer and philanthropist

George Henry Strutt DL (14 September 1826 – 14 April 1895) was an English cotton manufacturer and philanthropist.

Strutt was born at Belper, Derbyshire, the son of Jedediah Strutt (1785–1854) and his wife Susannah Walker. The Strutt family had been cotton manufacturers at Belper since the time of Jedediah Strutt. Strutt lived at Bridge Hill House, Belper. He instigated the construction of Christ Church, Belper which was completed in 1850 and subsequently funded a substantial stone vicarage. He was a J.P. and Deputy Lieutenant of Derbyshire. In 1869 he was High Sheriff of Derbyshire

In 1870 Strutt converted a building in Belper into a cottage hospital for convalescent mill workers. In November 1870 he attended the inaugural meeting of Derbyshire County Cricket Club and became vice president of the club. He arranged for Belper Market Place to be paved in 1880. and donated £1000 to an endowment fund for the Derbyshire Hospital for Sick Children in 1885. In 1887 Strutt became President of Derbyshire County Cricket Club and was a generous supporter of the club. He donated a fire engine to the town of Belper in 1889.

Strutt travelled extensively in continental Europe and his travel diaries from 1864 to 1893, including an account of an earthquake in the Alps, are held in the archives of Derbyshire Record Office The people of Belper paid for a fountain to be placed in the centre of their market place to thank Strutt for his support. The fountain has never worked because it was never connected to the water supply.

Strutt married Agnes Anne Ashton, daughter of Edward Ashton of West End, Prescot, Lancashire, at Belper on 15 September 1846. He was the father of George Herbert Strutt (1854-1928) and daughters Susan Agnes (1847-1894), Lucy Frances (1850-1914) and Clara (1861-1863).

Honorary titles
Preceded by Francis Westby Bagshawe	High Sheriff of Derbyshire; 1869–1870	Succeeded by Eben William Robertson
