= W. J. Coffee =

English artist and sculptor

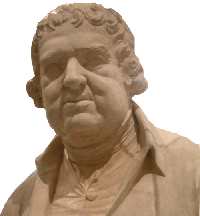
Stone-cast bust of Erasmus Darwin, made by Coffee c 1795

William John Coffee (1774–1846) was an English artist and sculptor who worked in porcelain, plaster, and terra cotta. He also worked in oil paint, although this was not the medium for which he became famous. His early career was as a modeller for William Duesbury at the china factory on Nottingham Road in Derby, England. The latter part of his life was spent in America.

== Biography ==
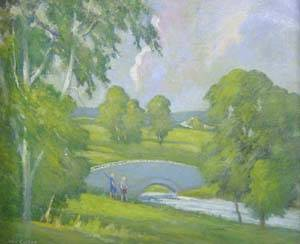
One of his paintings

Little is known of his early life, but from 1790 to 1792 he worked for Eleanor Coade in her large sculpture yard in the Lambeth district of London. He left in 1792 following a disagreement with the junior partner, John Sealy. Under Coade he learned the secrets of Coade stone and used this for much of his work.

Coffee then went north to work for William Duesbury in Derby, but he also worked at Pinxton Porcelain and potteries at Friar Gate in Derby and at the village of Church Gresley. During his time in Derby, Coffee made busts of some of the local dignitaries and historic figures including a life size bust of Erasmus Darwin. This bust is now on display at Derby Museum.

Coffee also produced a terra cotta copy of the Florentine Boar (1806) and a number of terra cotta statues of Greek figures representing medicine and healing for the garden of Joseph Strutt.The Boar was moved from Strutt's garden to the Derby Arboretum, which Strutt donated to the town. The Boar was destroyed during World War II but has been replaced since then. Coffee also made a 10-foot-tall (3.0 m) terra cotta statue of Asclepius, the Greek god of medicine, for William Strutt's Derby Infirmary, which was mounted above a dome at the pinnacle of the newly designed hospital.

In 1816, Coffee emigrated from England to New York City, where he became famous as a sculptor of American historical figures such as James Madison and Thomas Jefferson. Coffee moved up-state to Albany in 1826, where he received commissions including two plaques for the Albany City Hall, c. 1831. He also made the ornamental plaster mouldings for Jefferson's house and for the University of Virginia. Coffee also sculpted a statue of Winfield Scott, which later served as a model for an engraving of Scott on a U.S. Postage stamp, issued in 1870.

Coffee died in 1846.
