= Bargate, Derbyshire =

Hamlet in Derbyshire, England

Coordinates: 53.01°N 01.46°W

Bargate
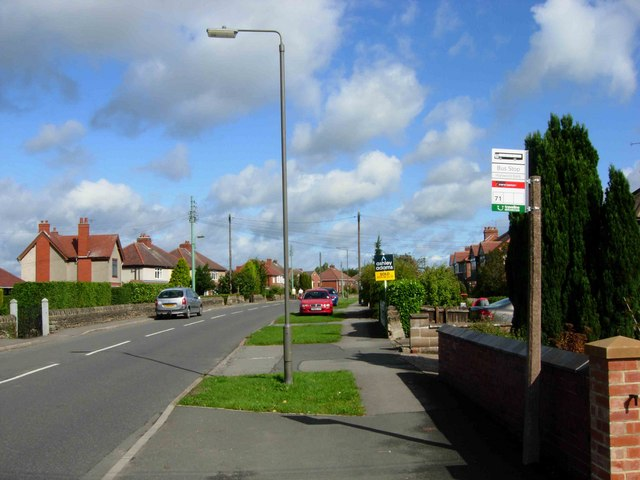
- Sandbed Lane, Bargate

- Location within Derbyshire
- OS grid reference: SK361463
- Civil parish: Belper
- Shire county: Derbyshire
- Region: East Midlands
- Country: England
- Sovereign state: United Kingdom
- Post town: Belper
- Postcode district: DE56
- Dialling code: 01773
- Police: Derbyshire
- Fire: Derbyshire
- Ambulance: East Midlands

Bargate is a hamlet in Derbyshire, England. It is a linear settlement as it has only one main road running through it: Belper Road which becomes Sandbed Lane (at the top Bargate Road) runs from Holbrook to Openwoodgate. Bargate Road runs down to Belper from the junction of Belper road and Sandbed Lane. Other roads include Highwood Avenue, Blackbird Row, The Croft and Bargate View, which is a development completed in 2008 with around 25 houses on the east side of Sandbed Lane. There is one pub in Bargate, The White Hart, which serves a range of real ales. There used to be a post office, a general store, a butcher, a hairdresser and a pet shop but these no longer exist. There also used to be a small grocery shop which doubled as a chip shop in the evenings. The nearest primary school is in Holbrook and the nearest secondary school is in Belper. Bargate is served by a bus service that runs to Derby every hour. The nearest train station is about 2 miles (3.2 km) away in Belper.
