= William Strutt (inventor) =

English inventor (1756–1830)

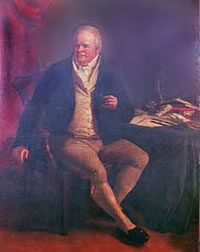
- Born: 1756
- Died: 1830 (aged 73–74)
- Education: to age 14
- Occupations: Civil engineer, inventor
- Spouse: Barbara Evans
- Children: 4, including Lord Belper
- Father: Jedediah Strutt
- Relatives: Joseph Strutt (brother)

William Strutt, FRS (1756–1830) was an English cotton spinner in Belper, Derbyshire, England, and later a civil engineer and architect, using iron frames in buildings to make them fire-resistant.

== Early career ==
Strutt was the first son of Jedediah Strutt and, after a good education, joined his father's business at the age of fourteen. He also inherited his father's mechanical abilities and is said to have thought of the self-acting mule some years before Richard Roberts patented it in 1830, but the technology was not available to make it work.

Be that as it may, he looked after the technical side of the business, while his brothers, Joseph and George Benson dealt with commercial and management side respectively. It became known as W.G. and J. Strutt.

In 1801 he bought St Helen's House in King Street, Derby and used it as his family home until his death. He became a successful architect, designing many of the bridges in Derby and the original Derbyshire General Infirmary in 1810. In 1779 he was made a freeman of Derby and Burgess of the Borough, allowing him to vote in Parliament. He was co-founder of the Derby Philosophical Society with Thomas Gisborne, Richard French, Erasmus Darwin and other individuals, and was president for twenty-eight years.

== Fire-resistant buildings ==
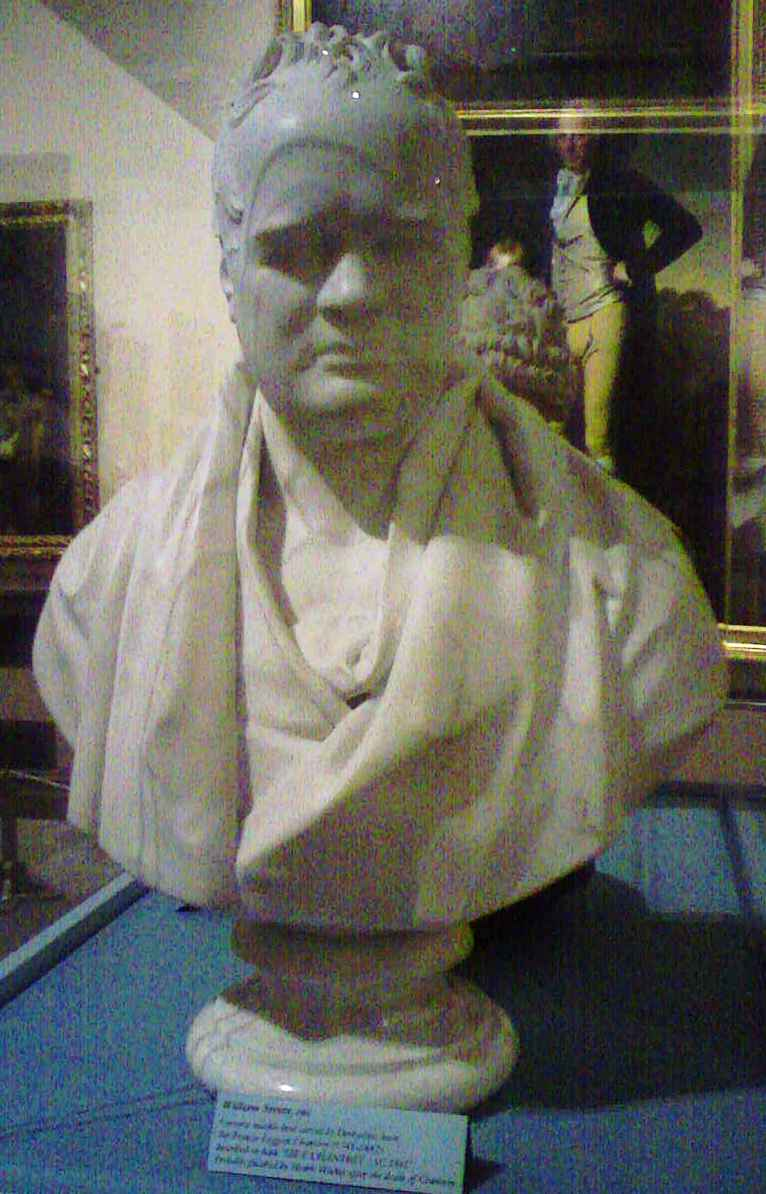
A bust of Strutt by Francis Chantrey in Derby Museum and Art Gallery

One of Strutt's most important concerns was the development of fire-resistant structures and technology in textile mills and the application of these in other contexts. A major problem with the nineteenth-century timber-framed mills was fire, particularly if they worked with inflammable materials. When Darley Abbey Mill burnt down in 1788, it was rebuilt with sheets of tin fastened to the beams as protection. Many engineers of the day were addressing the problem which was nationwide.

Strutt had used cast-iron for bridges in Derby, and applied it to building a calico mill in Derby, the Warehouse at Milford (pulled down in 1964 to make a car park), and then the new West Mill, built in 1795 at Belper. Tile and gypsum plaster floors were supported on brickwork arches supported on cast-iron columns. The timber beams were encased in thin sheet iron. To reduce weight, the upper floors were supported on hollow earthenware pots encased in plaster.

He rebuilt Belper North Mill after it burnt down in 1803 using an iron-framed structure pioneered by Charles Bage at Ditherington in Shrewsbury.

Strutt built a number of other mills in Belper and Milford, of which the most remarkable was perhaps the Round Mill. This is believed to have been influenced by the ideas of Jeremy Bentham for a "Panopticon" building with a central overseer.

== Family ==
He married Barbara, the daughter of Thomas Evans of Darley Abbey, his first son Edward later becoming Lord Belper. He also had three daughters, Elizabeth, Anne and Frances, and another two daughters who died in infancy.

== Scientific and civic activities ==
In 1817 he was elected a Fellow of the Royal Society, his five proposers including Marc Isambard Brunel and James Watt. Strutt held the office of Deputy Lieutenant (D.L.) of Derbyshire. Charles Hutton's 1815 list of England's most notable private observatories included Strutt's observatory at Derby.

== Derby Infirmary ==
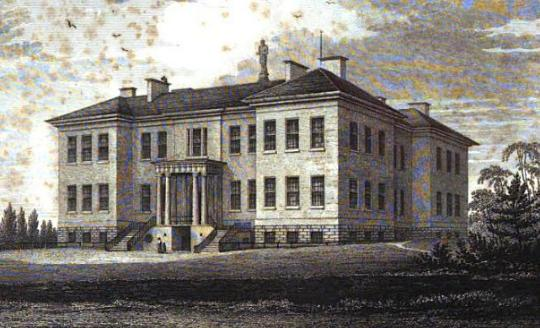
Strutt's new Infirmary for Derby

In 1819 Strutt designed and built the Derby Infirmary, which he worked on with his friend Charles Sylvester. Sylvester documented the new ways of heating hospitals that were included in the design and the healthier features such as self-cleaning and air refreshing toilets. Strutt incorporated many new features into the infirmary including his fire-proof construction and novel heating that allowed the patients to breathe fresh heated air whilst old air was channelled up to a glass and iron dome at the centre. Strutt's infirmary culminated in a giant statue of Aesculapius designed by William John Coffee. Sylvester described the advances that Strutt had made and this was successful in three ways. Sylvester was able to take the new ideas for heating and apply them in numerous other building projects. The Derby Infirmary was seen as a leader in European architecture and architects and visiting Royalty were brought to see its features.

Strutt died in 1830 and was buried in the Unitarian Chapel in Friargate, Derby. The President of the Royal Society eulogised Strutt in 1831 as "author of those great improvements in the construction of stoves, and in the economical generation and distribution of heat, which have of late years been so extensively and so usefully introduced in the warming and ventilation of hospitals and public buildings".
