= Lee Barrow =

English footballer (born 1973)

Personal information
- Full name: Lee Alexander Barrow
- Date of birth: 1 May 1973 (age 53)
- Place of birth: Belper, England
- Position: Centre back

Team information
- Current team: Heather St John's (manager)

Senior career*
Years	Team	Apps	(Gls)
1991–1992	Notts County	0	(0)
1992–1993	Scarborough	11	(0)
1993–1997	Torquay United	164	(5)
1997–2000	Barry Town	97	(10)
2000–2001	Aberystwyth Town	26	(0)
2001–2002	Hednesford Town	24	(2)
2002–2003	Stafford Rangers	58	(3)
2003–2006	Hednesford Town	78	(8)
2006	Leek Town	15	(1)
2006–2007	Kidsgrove Athletic	16	(0)
2007–2009	Rushall Olympic	53	(2)
2009–2011	Mickleover Sports		
2011–2012	Gresley	34	(1)
2013–14	Heather St John's		

Managerial career
- 2013–: Heather St John's
- * Club domestic league appearances and goals as of 12:00, 29 July 2013 (UTC)

Lee Alexander Barrow (born 1 May 1973) is an English former professional footballer who played in the Football League for Scarborough and Torquay United. He became player-manager of Midland Football Alliance club Heather St John's in 2013.

== Playing career ==
Barrow began his career as an apprentice with Notts County, turning professional in July 1991, though in August 1992 he moved to Scarborough having not yet made his league debut. After only 11 games for Scarborough, Barrow moved to Torquay United in February 1993, soon establishing himself as a first-team regular.

In September 1997, he moved to League of Wales side Barry Town for a fee of £7,500, very quickly becoming a firm favourite amongst the Barry supporters. In the 2000 close-season, after 3 very successful seasons at Barry where he played in Europe and won two Welsh league titles, he moved to Aberystwyth Town remaining with the Parc Avenue side until December 2001 when he joined Hednesford Town.

He moved to Stafford Rangers in June 2002, but in December 2003 returned to Hednesford, making his Hednesford debut on 26 December against Stafford Rangers. He left Hednesford in July 2006, joining Leek Town.

After a spell at Kidsgrove, he joined Rushall Olympic in 2007 and later Gresley of the East Midlands Counties League in March 2011.

== Honours ==
Hednesford Town

- FA Trophy: 2003–04
