= George Herbert Strutt =

English industrialist and philanthropist (1854–1928)

- Born: 21 April 1854, Derbyshire
- Died: 17 May 1928; Scotland
- Education: Magdalen College, Oxford
- Occupations: Cotton Mill Owner, High Sheriff of Derbyshire, Philanthropist

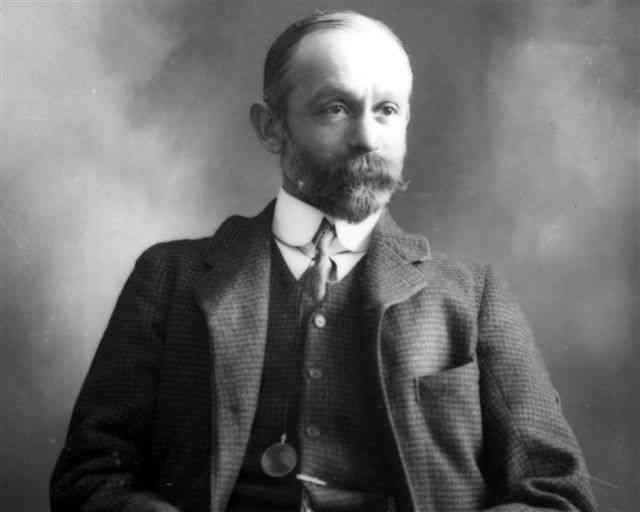
G. Herbert Strutt

George Herbert Strutt (21 April 1854 – 17 May 1928), was a cotton mill owner and philanthropist from Belper in Derbyshire. Strutt became a High Sheriff. He was a descendant of Jedediah Strutt. The Strutt family made themselves, and Britain, rich with their cotton business. Strutt bought the Scottish Glensanda estate where his son was lost and was found as a clothed skeleton five years later.

== Biography ==
George Herbert Strutt was born on 21 April 1854 in Belper. He was from the well known Strutt family whose fortune came from cotton mills and the inventions of the Strutt ancestors back to Jedediah Strutt. His father was George Henry Strutt and his mother was Agnes (born Ashton). He was the youngest child and only son. His two elder sisters were Susan Agnes and Lucy Frances Strutt. A third sister, Clara, was born in 1861, but died in 1863.

Strutt was educated at Harrow and at Magdalen College, Oxford. He married firstly Edith Adele Balguy on 2 April 1876 at Dartford in Kent. The marriage produced five daughters and two sons. In 1898 he married secondly Mary Emily Charlotte Hind, daughter of Robert Hind of the Royal Navy. This marriage produced four daughters and one son.

In 1902, Strutt, and his second wife Emily, bought the Glensanda and Kingairloch estates on the Morvern Peninsula in Scotland. At these 24,000-acre (97 km^{2}) estates he built cottages and pony paths, enlarged the existing house and a dam in Glen Galmadale to hold water that could be used to keep the River Galma in flow (and fish) when there was a drought. The Strutt family were able to take cruises to Oban and nearby islands on the 150 ton steam ship, Sanda, Strutt kept there. Given the inaccessibility of the estate, a boat of some form was essential.

He was appointed a deputy lieutenant of Derbyshire in 1901, and was High Sheriff of Derbyshire in 1903.

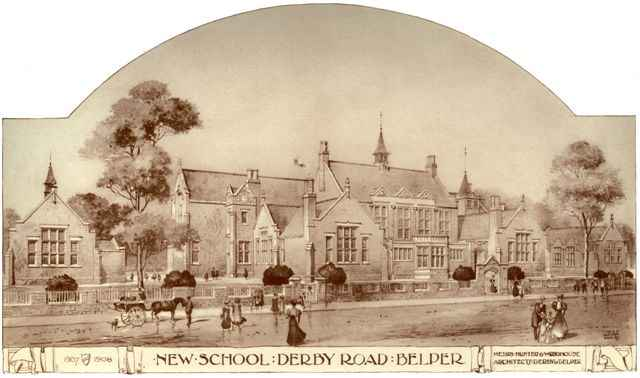
Herbert Strutt School

In 1907, he completed a long debate with the education authorities and was able to fund an elementary school for the children of Belper and its surrounding Derbyshire villages. The school was opened on 7 May 1909 by the Duke of Devonshire. The Herbert Strutt School cost Strutt £20,000 and included large playing fields and stained glass in the library showing the Strutt coat of arms. In 1910, he funded a public swimming pool in Belper and within four years he gave an additional £5,000 to expand the school's facilities. The school went on to become a Grammar school before it merged with two secondary modern schools to create the Belper School. The school's name and Strutt's gift are remembered in the name of a primary school in Belper. The school building is now a community centre.

In 1921, Strutt again contributed to Derbyshire's Belper community. This time he gave land which was used to create the Memorial Gardens to remember those who had died in the First World War.

He died of pneumonia, aged 74, at Ballater in Scotland on 17 May 1928.

After Strutt's death, the estate at Glensanda was inherited by his son Arthur and then shared, in 1930, with Arthur's New Zealand wife, Patricia. Arthur died in odd circumstances. He went out one morning in 1977 and never returned; five years later he was presumed to be dead. On the Monday following his memorial service his body was found. His clothed skeleton was discovered half a mile from his home by forestry workers, but it was too late to ascertain his cause of death.

Portraits of Strutt and "Mrs George Strutt", both by Frank Ernest Beresford, are owned by Belper Town Council and Derby Art Gallery respectively.

Honorary titles
Preceded by Fitzherbert Wright	High Sheriff of Derbyshire; 1903–1904	Succeeded by William Curzon
