= Belper Lane End =

Village in Derbyshire, England

Coordinates: 53.0411°N 1.5037°W

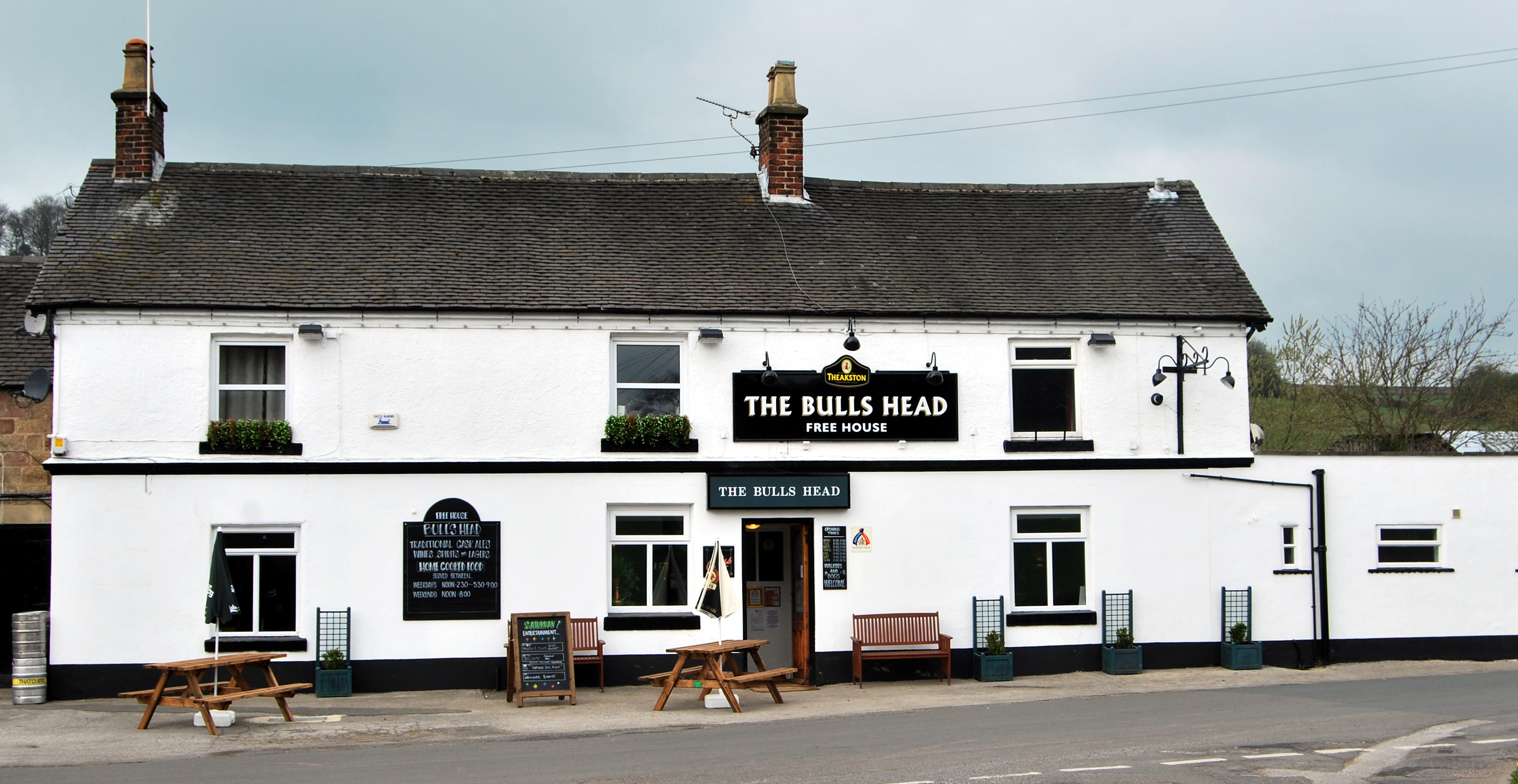
- Bull's Head Inn

- Location within Derbyshire
- Population: 150 (2001)
- OS grid reference: SK 334494
- Civil parish: Belper
- District: Amber Valley
- Shire county: Derbyshire
- Region: East Midlands
- Country: England
- Sovereign state: United Kingdom
- Post town: BELPER
- Postcode district: DE56
- Dialling code: 01773
- Police: Derbyshire
- Fire: Derbyshire
- Ambulance: East Midlands
- UK Parliament: Mid Derbyshire

Belper Lane End is a village in the civil parish of Belper, in the Amber Valley district, in the county of Derbyshire, England.

== History ==
Belper lane End is around a mile north west of and above the historic industrial town of Belper. There is evidence within and near the village of mining. The Bull's Head Inn sits in a prominent position on the junction of Belper Lane and Dalley Lane. It is an old coaching inn mentioned as a stopping place for coaches travelling on the turnpiked, tolled Wirksworth to London Road in 1794. Historical maps show the position of a Wesleyan Chapel, now converted for residential use, on Belper Lane.

== St Faith's ==
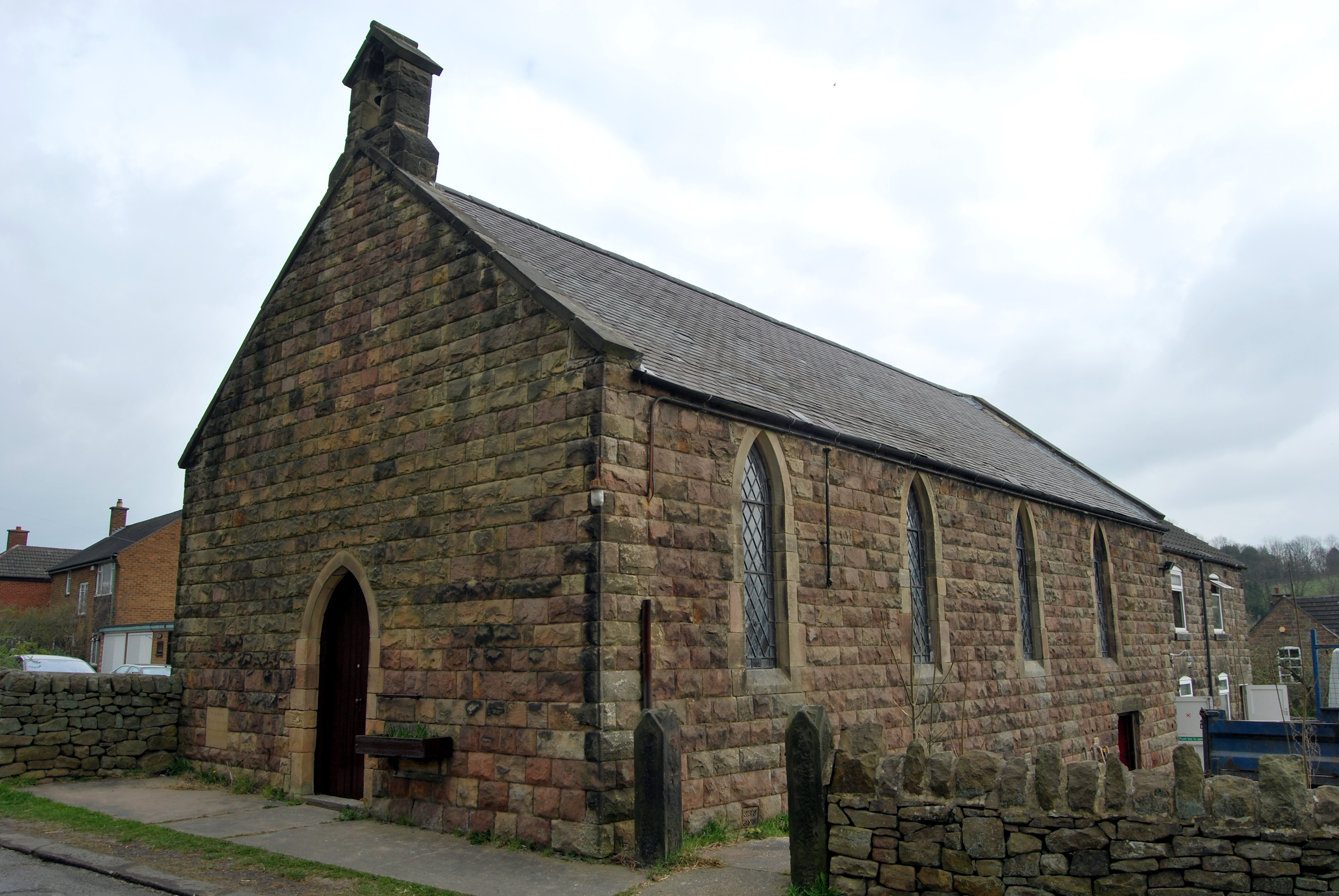
St Faith's Church

Further south on Dalley Lane is the small church dedicated to St Faith. The church was built in 1890 for the religious education of local children and use by the local community by the Sisters of the Convent of St. Lawrence of Belper together with the then vicar of Belper's Christ Church. The church was closed for use in 2005 by the diocese to the great regret of local residents, who formed the “Friends of St Faith's” group and fought to bring attention to their cause, even holding a Harvest Festival in field opposite the church. The property came to the attention of Caroline Foster who was able to buy the church, and attached cottages. The church was registered as a place of public worship. In April 2014, Foster surrendered her interest in St Faith's, and it was sold to a group of residents as a joint community hall and place of worship.

As of 2025, monthly services are still held in the church.
