= Joseph Strutt (philanthropist) =

English businessman and philanthropist

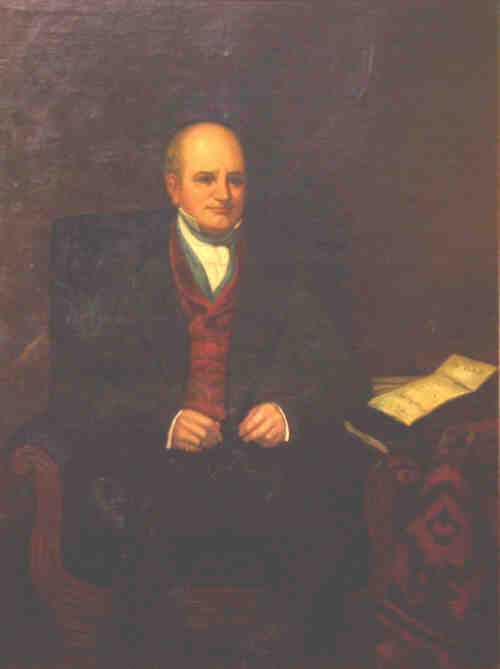
Joseph Strutt, from a portrait that hangs in the Mayoral Gallery in Derby Council House

Joseph Strutt (1765–1844) was an English businessman and philanthropist, whose wealth came from the family textile business. A native of Derby, Strutt was a radical social reformer who made significant donations and founded several important institutions in the town, including donating the land for the creation of Derby Arboretum, England's first urban public park. He twice served as Mayor of Derby.

== Background and early life ==
Joseph was the youngest son of Jedediah Strutt of Derby and Elizabeth Woolatt, who had two other sons, William and George. The Strutt family made a fortune from a silk, cotton and calico mill on the Morledge at Derby. Three brothers worked in the family business: William in technical aspects, Joseph marketing and George management.

Joseph was baptised at the Unitarian Chapel on Friar Gate, Derby on 19 September 1765, and subsequently educated at Derby School.

== Family ==
In 1793 he married Isabella Archibold Douglas at St. Oswald's Church, Ashbourne, Derbyshire. Isabella subsequently died in 1801 leaving Joseph with a son and two daughters, Caroline and Isabella. Caroline married Edward Hurt but died in 1835. Isabella married John Howard Galton of Hadzor House and was the mother of Sir Douglas Strutt Galton.

== Career ==
Strutt served on the Derby Corporation from the age of 28, serving in numerous offices, including Chief Magistrate and two terms of office as Mayor of Derby. He served his second term as the first mayor of the reformed borough of Derby, taking office from November 1835 until November 1836.

He was a lifelong radical social reformer and dedicated the majority of his time in the service of the town. He had the firm conviction that in order to gain the respect of the working classes and reform them from "Their brutish behaviour and debasing pleasures" they must be allowed the same opportunities to enjoy civilized pleasures, such as art exhibitions and open spaces, as enjoyed by the upper classes.

He served as a Deputy Lieutenant of the local militia during the Napoleonic Wars, as England faced the threat of a French invasion.

Strutt opened up his own house and gardens at Thorntree House in St. Peter's Street, now the site of the HSBC Bank, as an art gallery and museum, for the benefit of all classes of Derby's citizens, in order to cultivate a common appreciation of works of art. The works of art included sculptures by W. J. Coffee, representing the work of sculptors of the Classical antiquity and Renaissance periods, as well as a collection of paintings by famous Renaissance artists. His collection of paintings offered an opportunity for ordinary working citizens to see examples of fine works of art. His collection of artifacts also included a fine example of an Egyptian Mummy, believed to be the one that now resides at Derby's Central Museum.

Amongst many other things, Strutt was president of the Mechanics Institution which he founded in 1824, and gave an annual subscription to support its work. The exhibition held in the Institute's lecture hall in 1839 included paintings which came from Strutt's collection. Many of these are thought to have joined the early collection of Derby Museums.

He also gave £1,000 to the Athenaeum Society, helping to build the Athenaeum Building, an art gallery and museum offering collections of art and exhibitions to the general public. He also gave some financial support to the Derbyshire General Infirmary (later to become the Derbyshire Royal Infirmary), which was designed and built by his elder brother, William.

Strutt is probably best known for his gift to the people of Derby of the Arboretum, which was designed to give instruction and be a place for exercise and entertainment; it is also recorded as the first public park in England. He enlisted the services of John Claudius Loudon to lay out his design, which was completed at a personal cost of £10,000.

Strutt died on 13 January 1844 at his home in St. Peters Street, after attending a meeting to cast his vote in favour of improving Derby's sanitary conditions. He had been ill for some time and suffered a relapse from which he never recovered. He was interred along with his wife, Isabella, at the Friargate Unitarian Chapel in Friar Gate. The chapel was demolished in the 1970s to make way for the Heritage Gate office complex, which now incorporates a modern Unitarian Chapel.
