= Belper =

Town and civil parish in Derbyshire, UK

Coordinates: 53.029°N 1.475°W

- Town and civil parish
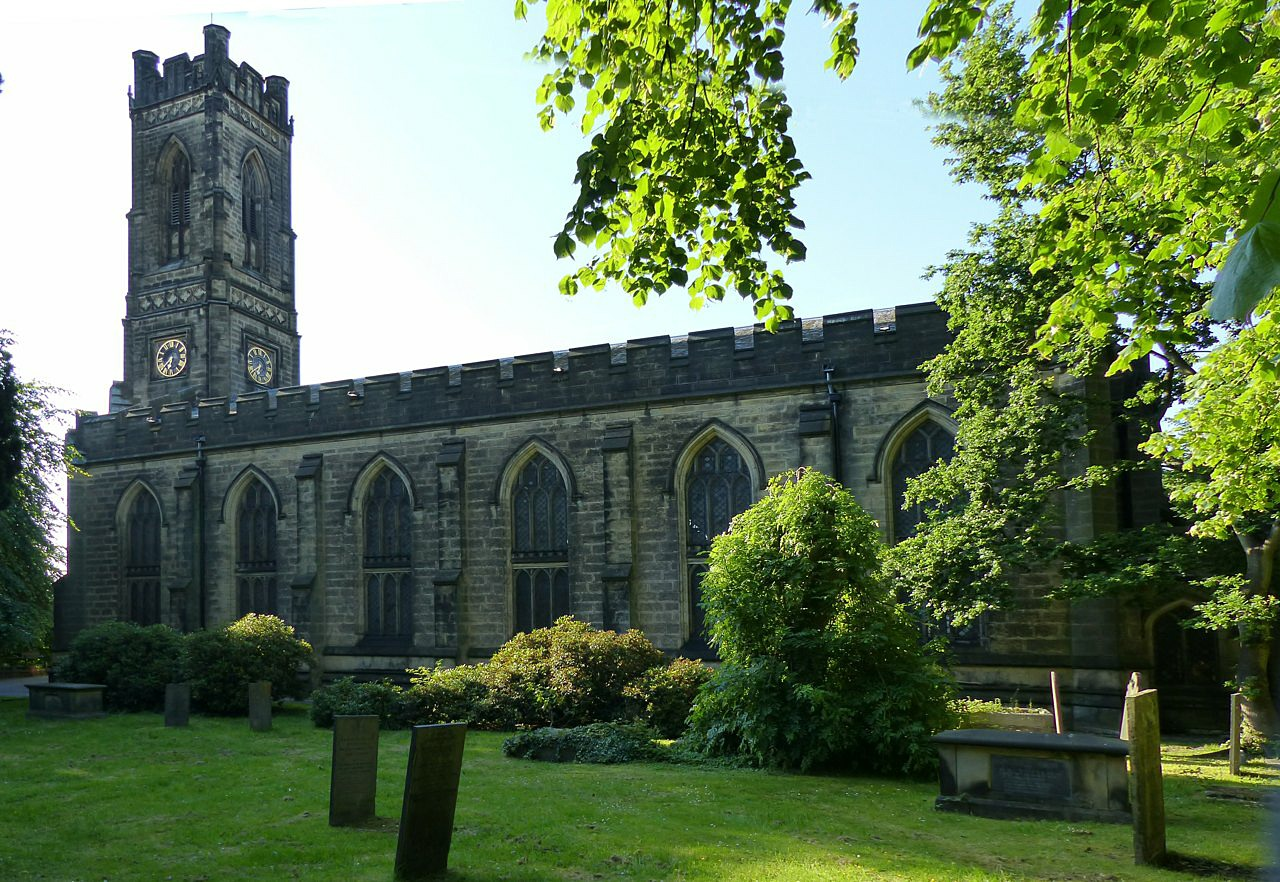
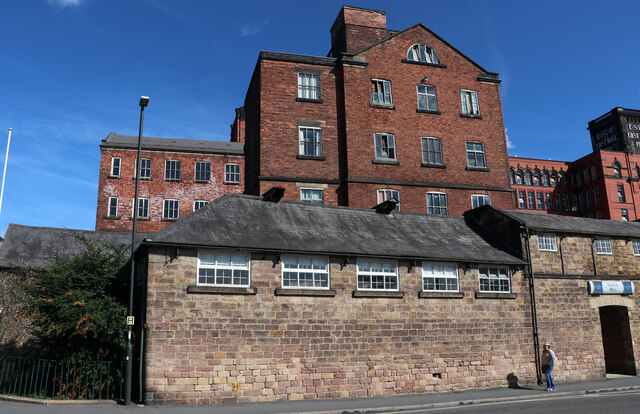
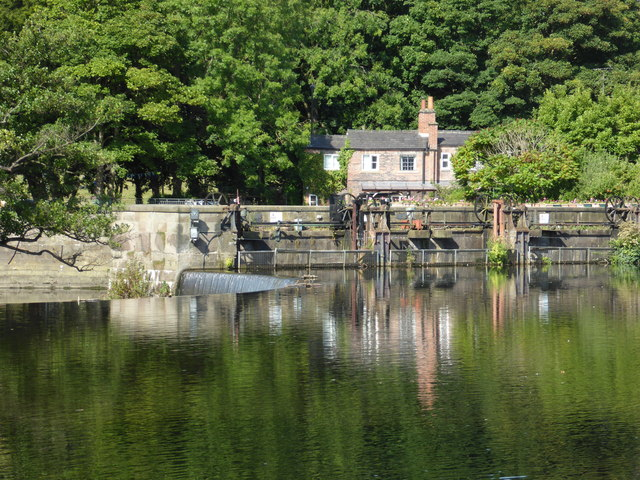
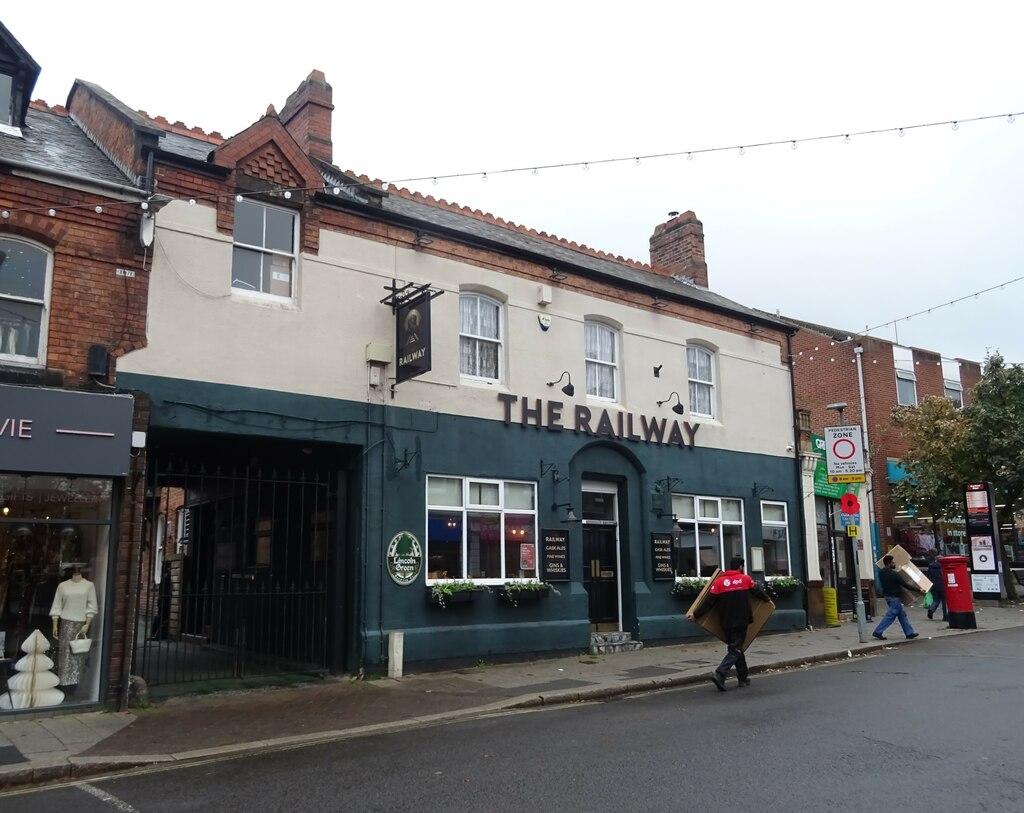
- St Peter's Church North Mill River Derwent King Street

- Belper parish highlighted within Derbyshire

- Location within Derbyshire
- Population: 21,440 (2021)
- OS grid reference: SK351476
- District: Amber Valley
- Shire county: Derbyshire
- Region: East Midlands
- Country: England
- Sovereign state: United Kingdom
- Post town: Belper
- Postcode district: DE56
- Dialling code: 01773
- Police: Derbyshire
- Fire: Derbyshire
- Ambulance: East Midlands
- UK Parliament: Mid Derbyshire

Belper (/ˈbɛlpər/) is a town and civil parish in the Amber Valley district of Derbyshire, England, located about 7 miles (11 km) north of Derby on the River Derwent. Along with Belper, the parish includes the village of Milford and the hamlets of Bargate, Blackbrook, and Makeney.

As of the 2021 census, the parish had a population of 21,440. Originally a centre for the nail-making industry since the Middle Ages, Belper expanded during the early Industrial Revolution to become one of the first mill towns with the establishment of several textile mills; as such, it forms part of the Derwent Valley Mills World Heritage Site.

== History ==
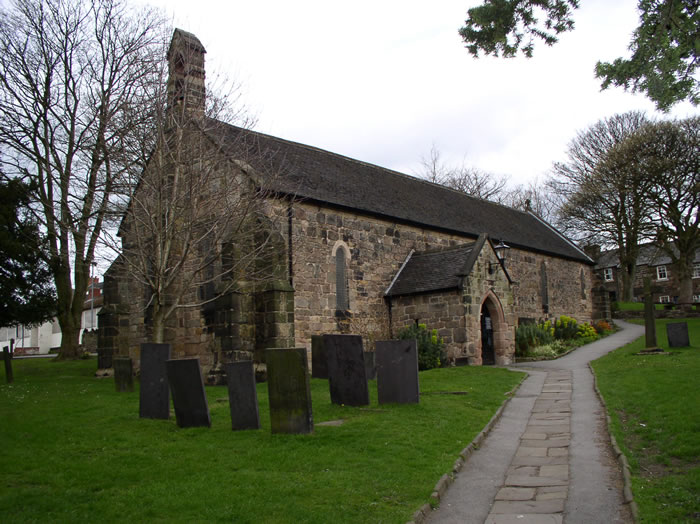
St. John's Chapel (formerly St Thomas's)

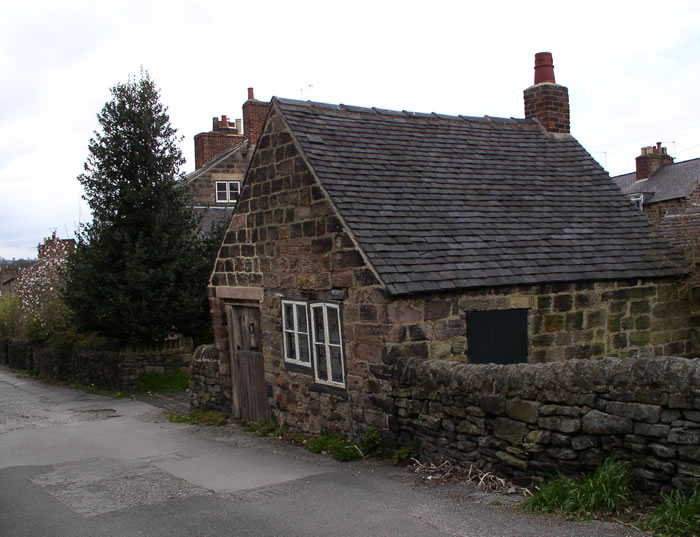
Nailer's workshop in Joseph Street

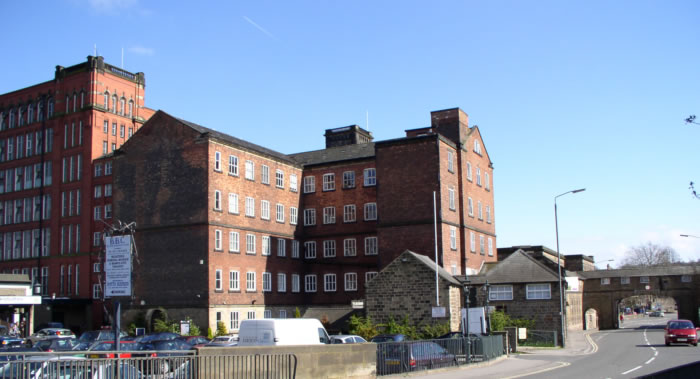
Strutt's North Mill built in 1803, to replace the original one destroyed by fire

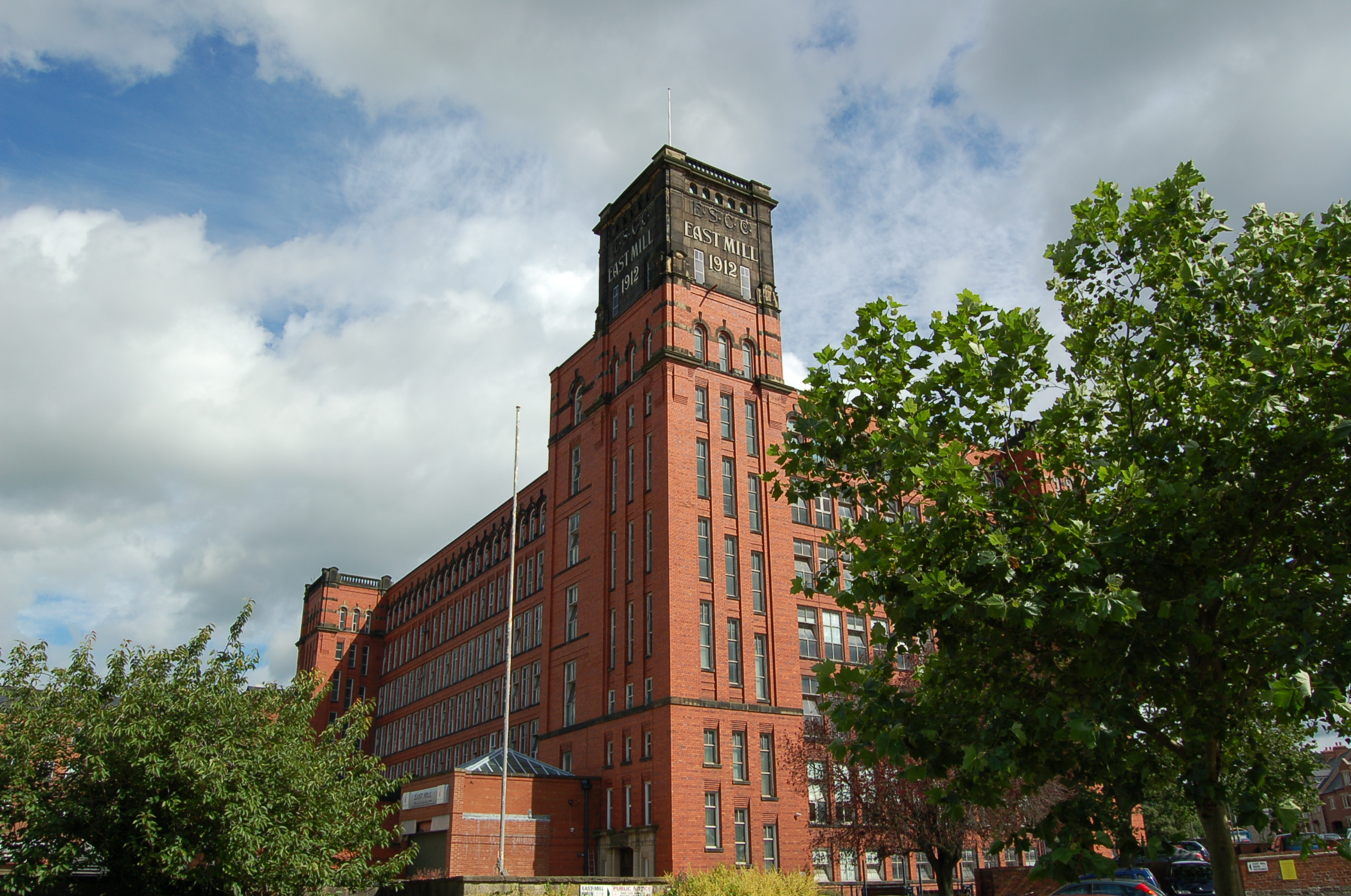
Belper's East mill, built 1912

At the time of the Norman occupation, Belper was part of the land centred on Duffield held by the family of Henry de Ferrers. The Domesday Book of 1086 records a manor of "Bradley" which is thought to have stood in an area of town now known as the Coppice. At that time it was probably within the Forest of East Derbyshire which covered the whole of the county east of the Derwent. It was possibly appropriated by William de Ferrers, 4th Earl of Derby at some time after it was disafforested in 1225 and became part of Duffield Frith.

The town's name is thought to be a corruption of Beaurepaire – meaning beautiful retreat – the name given to a hunting lodge, the first record of which being in a charter of 1231. This would have been the property of Edmund Crouchback, 1st Earl of Lancaster who died in 1296, the record of his estate mentioning "a capital mansion". The chapel built at that time still exists. Originally consecrated in 1250 as the Chapel of St Thomas, it was rededicated to St John during the reign of King Henry VIII. St John's Chapel is still in use today and is thought to be the oldest building still standing in Belper though it is now used for council meetings rather than church services.

The coal deposits of Derbyshire are frequently associated with ironstone within the clay substrate. Initially obtained from surface workings, it would later have been mined in shallow bell pits. It is thought that this was important for the de Ferrers family, who were ironmasters in Normandy. By the reign of Henry VIII Belper had grown to a substantial size. It is recorded that in 1609 fifty-one people died of plague. However, in a Parliamentary Commissioners' report of 1650 regarding Duffield and its chapelries, Belper is described as "a hamlet appertaining to Duffield".

From at least the 13th century there were forges in the Belper and Duffield areas and iron-working became a major source of income, particularly nail making. By the end of the 18th century there were around 500 workshops in the town supplying nails to the newly built textile mills. The workshops were eventually superseded by machinery during the 19th century. Some of the nail-makers' houses are still in existence and form part of local tours of the town.

The industrialist Jedediah Strutt, a partner of Richard Arkwright, built a water-powered cotton mill in Belper in the late 18th century: the second in the world at the time. With the expansion of the textile industry Belper became one of the first mill towns. In 1784 Strutt built the North Mill and, across the road, the West Mill. In 1803 the North Mill was burnt down and replaced by a new structure designed to be fireproof. Further extensions followed, culminating in the East Mill in 1913 – a present-day Belper landmark. Although no longer used to manufacture textiles the mill still derives electricity from the river, using turbine-driven generators.

Strutt had previously patented his "Derby Rib" for stockings, and the plentiful supply of cotton encouraged the trade of framework knitting which had been carried on in the town and surrounding villages since the middle of the previous century. Mechanisation arrived about 1850, but by that time the fashion for stockings for men was disappearing. However elaborately patterned stockings, for ladies especially, were coming into vogue, and the output of the Belper "cheveners" was much in demand.

The construction of the North Midland Railway in 1840 brought further prosperity. Belper was the first place in the UK to get gas lighting, at a works erected by the Strutts at Milford. Demand was such that in 1850, the Belper Gas and Coke Company was formed, with a works in the present Goods Road. Electricity followed in 1922 from the Derby and Nottingham Electrical Power Company's works at Spondon. The first telephones came in 1895 from the National Telephone Company. The end of the century also brought the motor car, CH218, owned by Mr. James Bakewell of The Elms being possibly the first.

Belper remained a textile and hosiery centre into the 20th century. Meanwhile, other companies were developing: iron founding led to Park Foundry becoming a leader in the solid-fuel central-heating market; Adshead and Ratcliffe had developed Arbolite putty for iron-framed windows; Dalton and Company, which had been producing lubricating oils, developed ways of recovering used engine oil proving useful during the Second World War. In 1938, A. B. Williamson had developed a substance for conditioning silk stockings; the introduction of nylon stockings after the Second World War seemed to make it redundant, but mechanics and fitters had discovered its usefulness in cleaning hands and it is still marketed by Deb Group as Swarfega.

== Governance ==
Administratively, Belper Town Council manages first tier local government services, with Amber Valley Borough and Derbyshire County councils providing successively higher level services.

For Westminster elections, the parish is part of the Mid Derbyshire constituency which has been represented by Jonathan Davies (Labour) since 2024. Until 1983 the town gave its name to the Belper constituency, which from 1945 to 1970 was the seat of George Brown, the deputy leader of the Labour Party.

== Geography ==
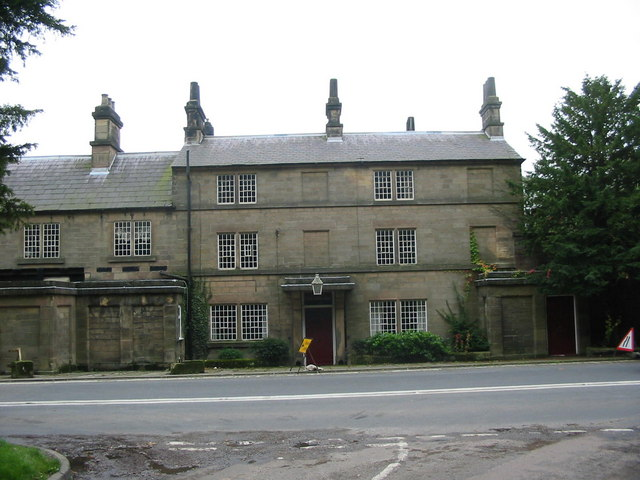
Crossroads Farm in Blackbrook

Belper is 8 miles (13 km) north of Derby and is in the valley of the River Derwent.

As well as Belper itself, the civil parish includes the communities and hamlets of:

- Bargate
- Belper Lane End
- Blackbrook
- Broadholm (not to be confused with Broadholme, Lincolnshire)
- Far Laund
- Farnah Green
- Makeney
- Milford
- Mount Pleasant
- Openwoodgate
- White Moor
- Wyver

=== Blackbrook ===
The hamlet of Blackbrook is 2 miles (3 km) west of Belper on the A517 Ashbourne road.

=== Openwoodgate ===
The adjoining community of Openwoodgate lies to the east, one mile from the centre of Belper. A small eastern portion, centred around Openwood Road and the Kilburn Lane section of the A609 road, containing the historic Ireton Houses cottages and bordered by the A38, is contained within Denby parish.

=== Wyver ===
This is a rural district lying west of the River Derwent and just north of Belper and Mount Pleasant. It contains a nature reserve on a nineteen-acre site. The nearby lane is part of the Derwent Valley Heritage Way. The reserve is placed on a reoccurring flood plain which makes it an attractive place for wildlife, especially wading birds.

=== Hills ===
Hillside is to the west of Belper Lane End, and contains the highest point of the parish at 214 metres (702 ft).

Firestone Hill is to the west of the town by the parish boundary at 191 metres (627 ft). Several masts for communications are positioned there.

Another local feature is Bessalone Hill at 182 metres (597 ft) to the north. It also carries radio masts.

Pinchom's Hill is north of Bargate, by Sandbed Lane. It is 169 metres (554 ft) in height.

== Economy ==
Belper's economy was traditionally reliant on manufacturing industry and numerous goods were made in the town. Cotton spinning and textile production were major employers virtually for much of the 19th and early 20th centuries. The large East Mill and the smaller North Mill are now all that remain of the industry and are preserved as part of the Derwent Valley Mills world heritage site.

During the Second World War, Rolls-Royce based the Merlin aero engine design team and Robotham's engine design division developing the Meteor tank engine at Belper. After the Second World War, J. W. Thornton, the chocolate maker, moved into the town from Sheffield, which helped to alleviate the employment problems arising from the contraction of the earlier industries. In 1985, the company relocated to a new site a few miles away in Swanwick.

Today, the main employment sectors are retail and services although some manufacturing industry remains. The main shopping area is centred on King Street and Bridge Street. The town has three supermarkets, the Co-operative, Morrisons and Aldi. There are two discount shops, Poundland and B&M Bargains. There are smaller Tesco and Co-op supermarkets on the Whitemoor estate.

== Demographics ==
Census population of Belper parish
Census	Population	Female	Male	Households	Source
2001	20,548	10,412	10,136	8,790	
2011	21,823	11,104	10,719	9,480	
2021	21,440	10,952	10,488	9,714	

== Transport ==
The A6 is the major through-road of the town and runs parallel to the River Derwent to the west.

Belper railway station is situated on the Midland Main Line. Regular trains between Derby and Matlock on the Derwent Valley Line are almost the only services to stop there, although one main line service to and from Sheffield stops on weekdays at times designed to assist Belper residents working in Sheffield. The group 'Friends of the Derwent Valley Line' are campaigning for more such services.

The town is served by regular bus services to Derby and surrounding towns and villages as well as longer routes to Manchester and London. The major operator is Trent Barton who operate the bus garage on Bridge Street.

== Religion ==
The oldest church still used for its original purpose is the Belper Unitarian Church, built in 1788. The present Methodist church was opened on 28 June 1807 and was originally built to hold 1,400 worshippers.

St Peter's Church, a prominent landmark in the town, was built in 1824 to replace the smaller 13th century St John's Chapel which is now used as a town council and heritage chamber. A second Anglican church, Christ Church, was built in 1850. A local saying calls St Peter's "the low church in the high place" and Christ Church "the high church in the low place" based on their different liturgical traditions. Belper's churches are intertwined in a group known as "Churches Together" in which they work together on events, etc. Belper's parish, led by Rev. Ann Stratton, consists of St Peter's Church, St Swithun's Church and St Mark's Church.

The town is also home to Belper Baptist Church, a spiritualist, a Roman Catholic, Belper Congregational Church and a further Methodist church at Openwoodgate.

== Public services ==
Babington Hospital provides health services to the local people.

The town has a fire station, with one fire engine crewed by retained personnel.

== Culture ==
=== Sport ===
Belper Town F.C. play their home games at Christchurch Meadow and are currently play in the Northern Premier League Division One Midlands. They are nicknamed the Nailers as a reference to the historical nail manufacturing industry in the town.

Belper United F.C. are currently members of the United Counties League Premier Division North and play at Coronation Park, the home of Eastwood C.F.C. in Nottinghamshire.

Belper Rugby Club play their home games at Strutt's Playing Field and are currently competing in RFU Midlands 3 East (North). The club was founded in 1975.

Belper Meadows Cricket Club was founded in 1880 and still play on Christchurch Meadows, formerly the private ground of Mr G H Strutt, which it took as its home when the ground on Derwent Street on which the Belper Cricket Club founded in 1857 had played became unavailable. The club was a founder member (1970) and three times champion of the Central Derbyshire Cricket League before that league merged with the Derbyshire County Cricket League in 1991.

Belper Chess Club was founded in 1975 and has since grown into one of the county’s most active clubs. The club competes in the Derbyshire Chess Association leagues and in 2026 achieved back‑to‑back Derbyshire Chess Association Division 1 titles.

=== Poetry Trail ===
In 2009, members from two of the town's poetry groups completed a poetry trail in memory of local poet Beth Fender, who died in 2002. Beth's Poetry Trail consists of 20 poems situated in a variety of locations in the town, such as outside Belper Library. Poems by Emily Dickinson, Philip Larkin and Spike Milligan are included on the trail, as well as Beth's own poetry.

=== Awards ===
In 2014, Belper was presented with the High Street of the Year award for the Market Town category, as well as winning the award overall. The judges stated "Belper is blessed with a wonderful history as a World Heritage Site but has much to offer as a thriving market town as well. The judges felt that this outstanding application demonstrates how much more can be done to transform an outwardly successful town centre into a go-to destination for locals and visitors alike." Belper won against towns and high streets such as Brighton, Colwyn Bay and many other places. Belper won a further award in the Champion High Street category in 2019.

=== Music ===
Belper Singers are an experienced chamber choir of some 25 voices, who sing both sacred and secular works. They give about five performances a year, including singing in various cathedrals.

Belper is also home to a weekly folk club welcoming singers, instrumentalists, poets, readers and audience members. Two traditional dance teams make their home in the town: Heage Windmillers (rapper) and Makeney Morris (Cotswold morris).

Andy Sneap (born in Belper) is a Grammy-winning music producer, songwriter and guitarist with British heavy metal band Hell. He is one of the most active and successful music producers in the metal music genre, with over 100 albums produced at his Backstage Recording studios in the rural outskirts of the town.

=== The Belper Moo ===
The Belper Moo began in March 2020, in response to the nationwide lockdown prompted by the COVID-19 crisis. Started by Belper resident Jasper Ward, it was advertised on social media as a means of 'fighting lockdown stress, boredom and loneliness'. At 6.30pm, every evening, Belper residents were encouraged to mimic a cow's moo from their windows, doorways and gardens while following social distancing guidelines. The idea quickly caught the imagination of the people and Belper and spread rapidly around the town. Many residents fashioned their own devices for amplifying their moos, which became known as 'Moocraphones', 'Didgerimoos', Megamoophones' and 'Saxamoophones'. Following coverage on BBC radio and on BBC Online, 'The Moo' attracted media attention worldwide. Residents uploaded their 'moos' to the internet and a number of creative responses followed including songs, craft projects and poems. By early May, The Belper Moo had been participated in by thousands of residents for over 50 days. The Moo was resurrected during the November 2020 lockdown.

=== Pride in Belper ===
Belper has an annual Pride event, supporting the LGBT community, usually the first Saturday in August. This started in 2019 and has grown into a large community event with a parade, music and arts activities.

=== Belper Arts Trail ===
The annual Belper Arts Trail is an artist led initiative which aims for artists to exhibit and promote their work. It began in 2014 when two artists wanted to help strengthen the local artistic community and to find interesting and creative solutions to the lack of dedicated space in Belper for artists to exhibit. Utilising every possible space as a venue over the Arts Trail weekend art can now be found in a variety of unusual spaces. With Belper and Derbyshire overflowing with artistic talent it was felt that Belper really needed an interactive trail of creativity which has now grown each year to become a key Derbyshire event. The trail takes place annually over the May Day Bank Holiday.

=== Festivals ===
Belper has become well-known for its festivals with festivals such as "Belper Goes Green" (a musical event that aims to raise awareness of environmental problems and aims to share ways of reducing our impact on the planet), "Belper Games" (a festival where people compete in several challenges), "Belper Food Festival" (where stalls showcasing local business' food and dishes are put up around the town), and "Belper Music Festival" (where businesses have music on inside or outside their premises showing off local musicians and bands.) These events have become an annual occasion which help to boost the local economy throughout the town and support local small businesses.

== Media ==
Local news and television programmes are provided by BBC East Midlands and ITV Central. Television signals are received from the local relay TV transmitter.

Local radio stations are BBC Radio Derby on 104.5 FM, Smooth East Midlands on 101.4 FM, Capital Midlands on 102.8 FM, Greatest Hits Radio Midlands on 106 FM and Amber Sound FM, a community station that broadcasts on 107.2 FM in the Amber Valley and online.

Local newspapers are the Belper News and Derbyshire Times.

== Education ==
There are eight primary schools which feed the single secondary school:

- Holbrook Primary School;
- St Elizabeth's Catholic Voluntary Academy;
- St John's Church of England Primary School;
- Herbert Strutt Primary School;
- Pottery Primary School;
- Long Row Primary School;
- Ambergate Primary School;
- Milford Primary School.

Belper School and Sixth Form Centre has approximately 1,400 pupils aged 11–18. It was originally named "Belper High School" when it was built in 1973, and is adjacent to Belper Leisure Centre. Famous people to have attended the school include Ross Davenport – winner of two swimming gold medals at the 2006 Commonwealth Games – and Alison Hargreaves, holder of a number of mountaineering records.

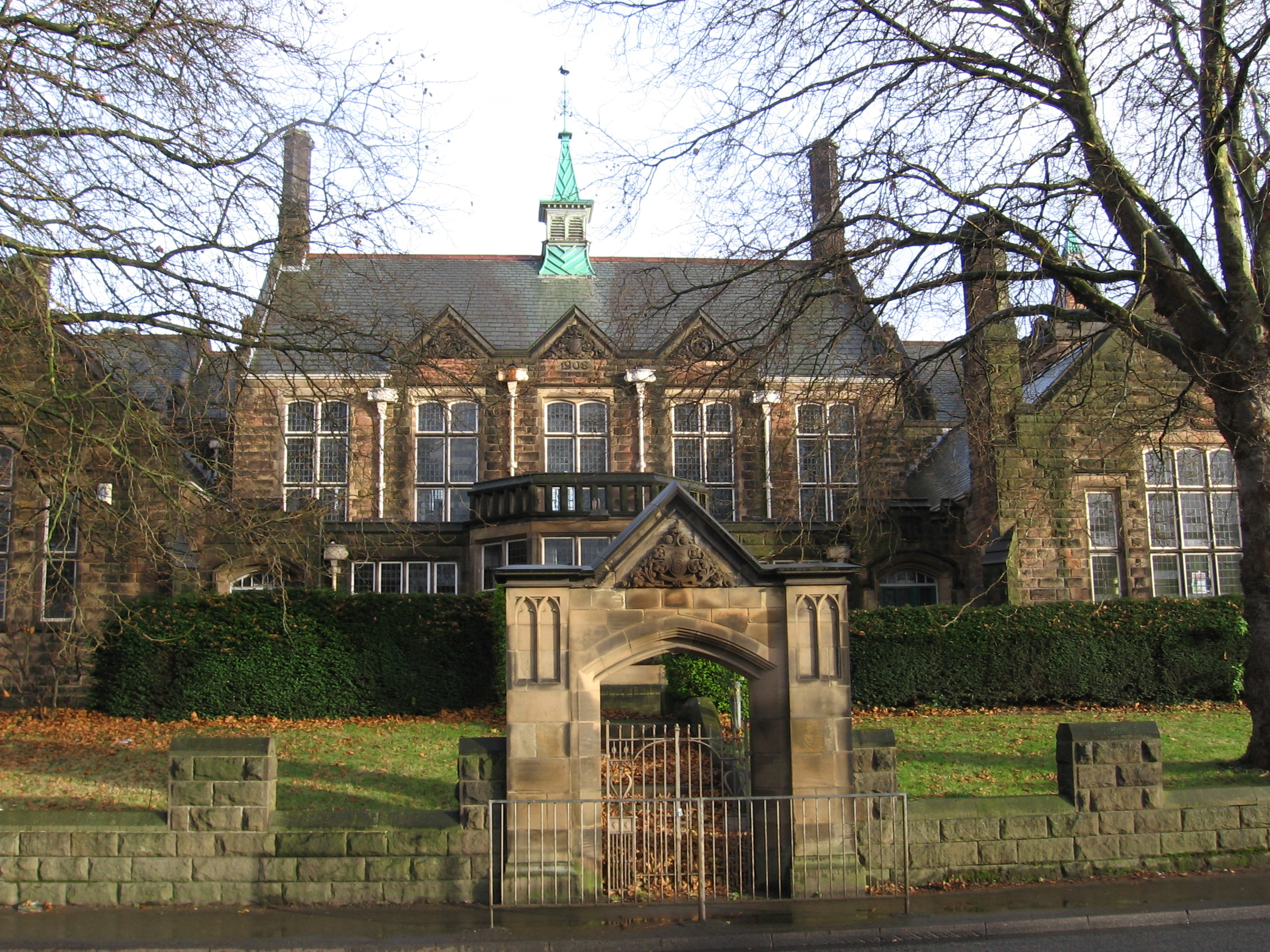
Herbert Strutt Grammar School buildings in November 2008

Herbert Strutt Grammar School was among the Strutt family's bequests to the town. It became a middle school in 1973, with the opening of the new Belper High School, and latterly a primary school, in use as such until spring 2008 when it was replaced by a new building on a different site. Notable among its pupils were the actors Alan Bates and Timothy Dalton.

For a number of years from 1979, the innovative Rowen House School provided education on democratic principles. Also, during the 1970s and 1980s, Belper was the site of an experimental three-tier education system, comprising a number of primary schools (age 5–9 years, referred to as "first" schools), feeding into two main secondary schools (age 9–13 years, referred to as "middle schools"), pupils from both then usually attended a single American-style high school (age 13–18 years). In the mid-1980s, this scheme was abandoned, and the current two-tier system adopted. At the same time, one of the two secondary schools, Parks Secondary School, was closed down and the buildings, which were in a poor state of repair, demolished. In recent years, the site of the former Parks Secondary School has been used for a new school.

== International links ==
Belper is twinned with Pawtucket, Rhode Island after Samuel Slater – an apprentice of Jedediah Strutt – went there and founded the American cotton spinning industry.

Belper made international news in 2001 after rejecting a gift of a large fibreglass Mr. Potato Head model from Pawtucket, as some residents considered it "hideous". The statue was refurbished and returned in 2015, though opinion is still divided.

== Notable residents ==
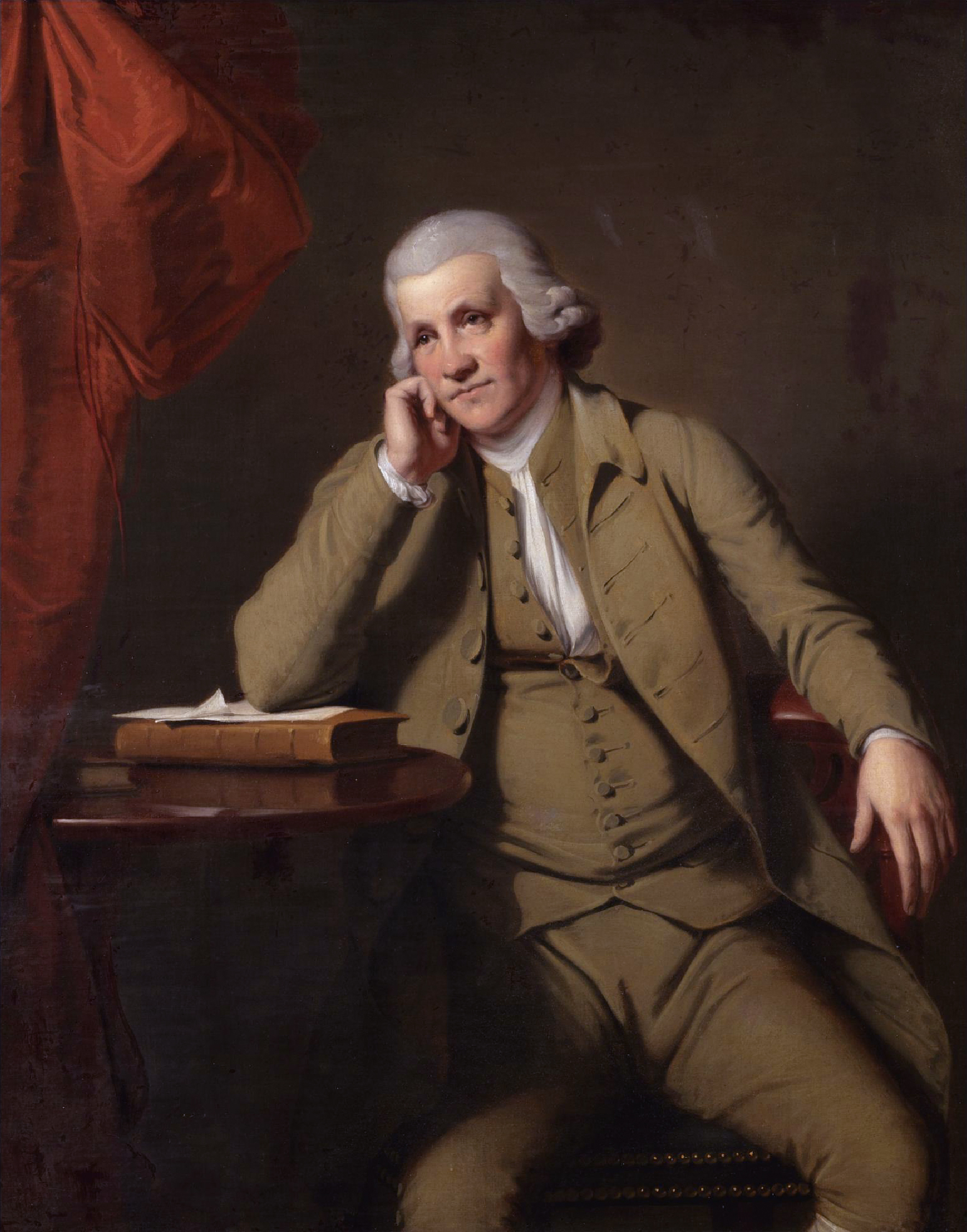
Jedediah Strutt ca.1787

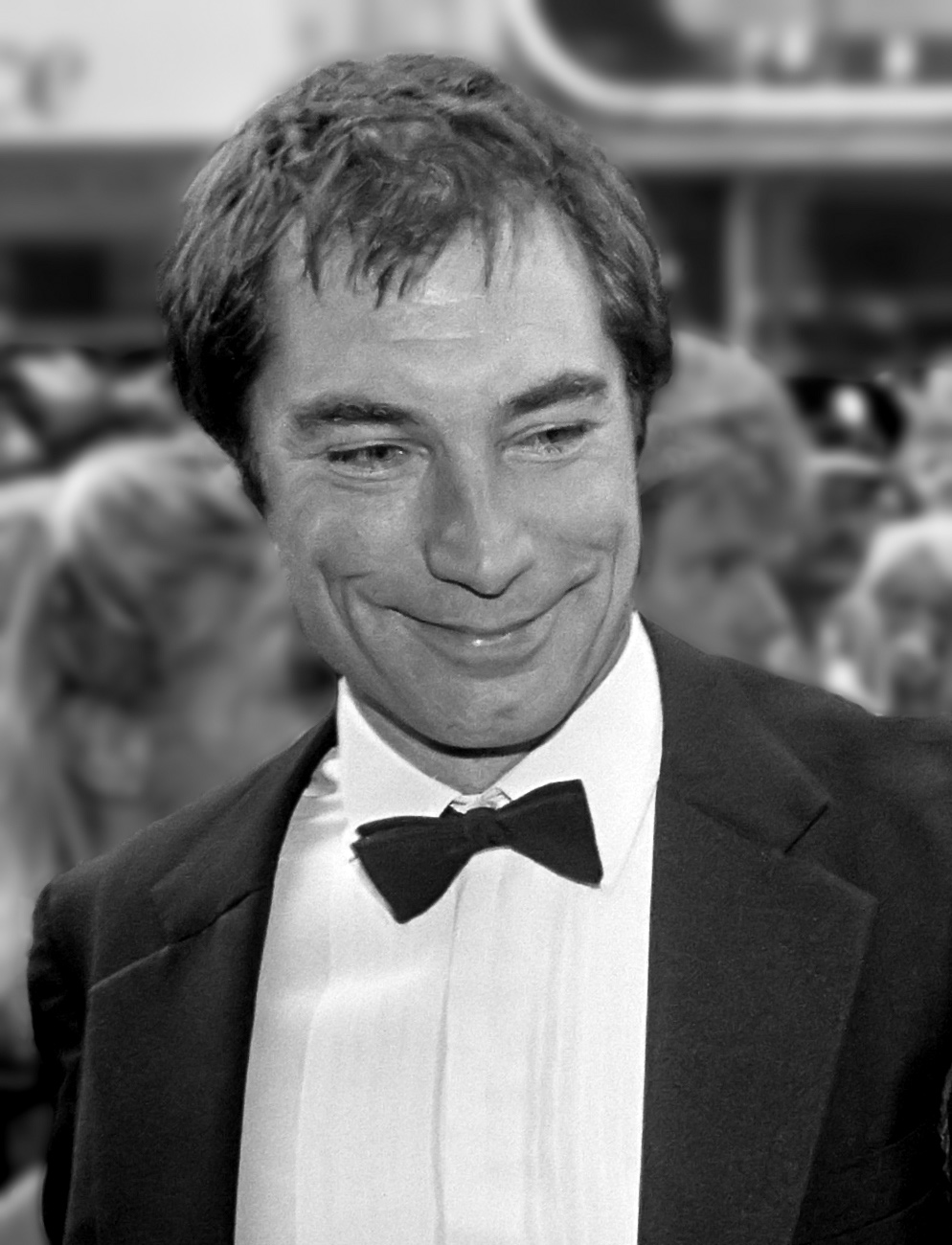
Timothy Dalton, 1987

- Jedediah Strutt (1726–1797), hosier, cotton spinner, inventor and industrialist, opened his first mill in Belper in 1777.
- William Strutt (1756–1830), cotton spinner, later used iron frames in buildings to make them fire-resistant.
- Samuel Harrison (1760–1812), singer
- Samuel Slater (1768–1835), early English-American industrialist, "father of the "American Industrial Revolution", grew up on Chevin Road and apprenticed at Milford
- George Henry Strutt (1826–1895), cotton manufacturer and philanthropist.
- Alexander Swettenham (1846–1933), colonial Governor of British Guiana and Governor of Jamaica.
- Frank Swettenham (1850–1946), colonial ruler of Malaya and author, was born in Belper.
- George Herbert Strutt (1854–1928), cotton mill owner and philanthropist
- Will Hay (1888–1949), comedian, lived in Belper while performing locally in the 1920s
- Charles Edwin Stone, (1889–1952), soldier awarded the Victoria Cross
- Monica Edwards (1912–1998), children's writer, wrote Romney Marsh and Punchbowl Farm series.
- Penelope Mortimer (1918–1999), novelist, author of The Pumpkin Eater, daughter of local vicar
- Alan Bates (1934–2003), actor
- Suzy Kendall (born 1937), actor in British and Italian films
- Timothy Dalton (born 1946), actor
- John Lawton (born 1949), novelist, author of Black Out and Blue Rondo, was born here
- Barry Coope (1954–2021), folk singer with Coope Boyes and Simpson, a vocal folk trio formed locally
- Trevor Soar (born 1957), Commander in Chief Fleet of the Royal Navy
- Maxwell Caulfield (born 1959), actor
- Kathryn Stone (born 1963), independent Parliamentary Commissioner for Standards from 2018 to 2022.
- Tracy Shaw (born 1973), actor, played Maxine Peacock (1995–2003) in Coronation Street

=== Sport ===
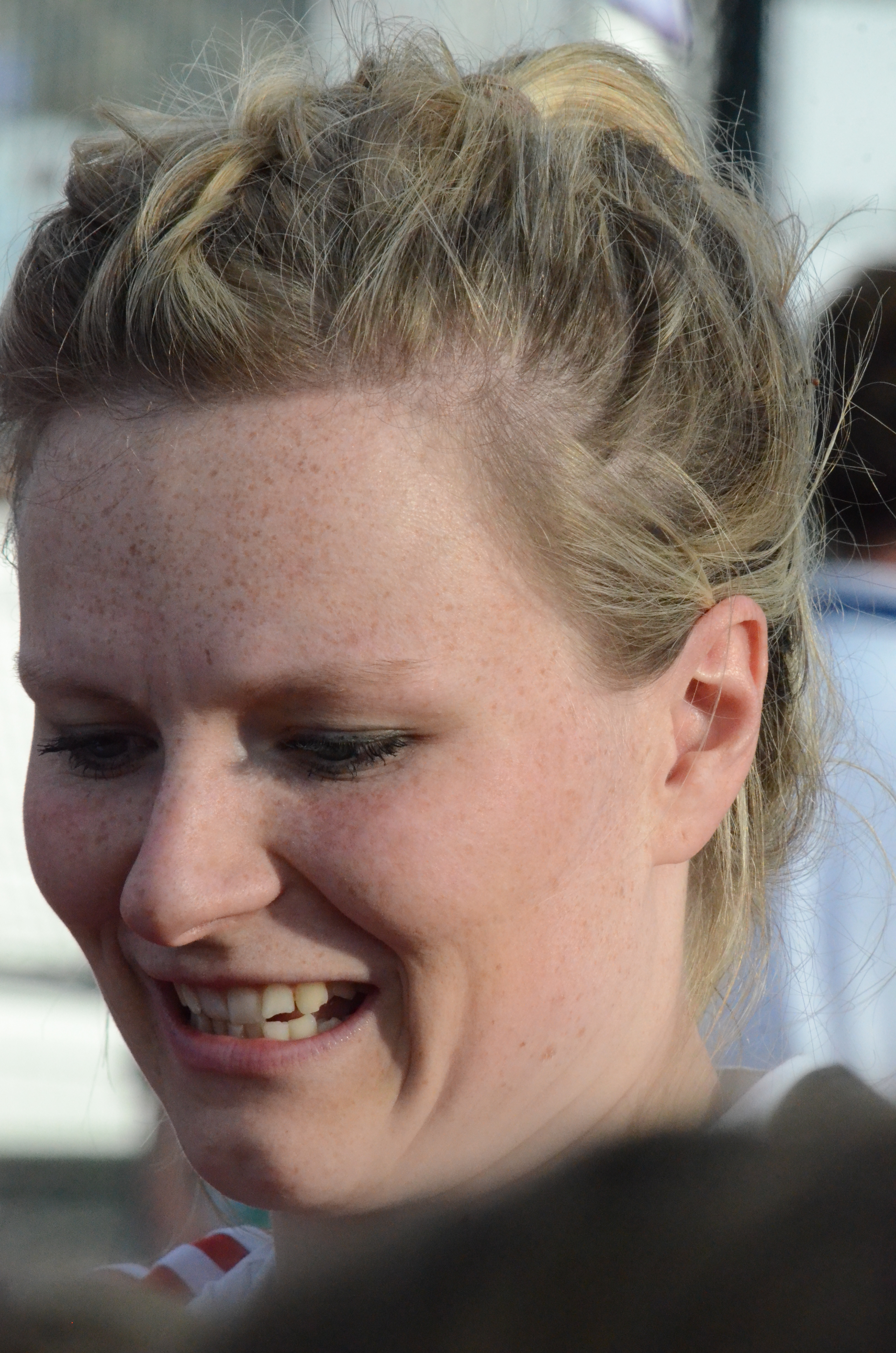
Hollie Pearne-Webb, 2013

- Ron Webster (born 1943), footballer, played 455 league games for Derby County
- John Sims (born 1952), footballer, played 345 games, mainly for Plymouth Argyle
- Andrew Jarrett (born 1958), tennis player, and tournament referee at Wimbledon for 14 years
- Wendy Watson (born 1960), cricketer, played in 7 Test matches and 23 One Day Internationals for England women
- Alison Hargreaves (1962–1995), mountaineer grew up in Belper
- Nigel Vardy (born 1969), mountaineer, grew up and was educated in Belper
- Lee Barrow (born 1973), footballer, played over 550 games including 164 for Torquay United
- Robert Clare (born 1983), footballer, played over 200 games, mainly for Stockport County
- Ross Davenport (born 1984), Commonwealth games double gold medalist swimmer and Olympian
- Tom Ballard (1988–2019), mountaineer and alpinist
- Hollie Pearne-Webb (born 1990), field hockey player, won team gold at the 2016 Summer Olympics

== See also ==
- Listed buildings in Belper
