= Jedediah Strutt =

English industrialist (1726-1797)

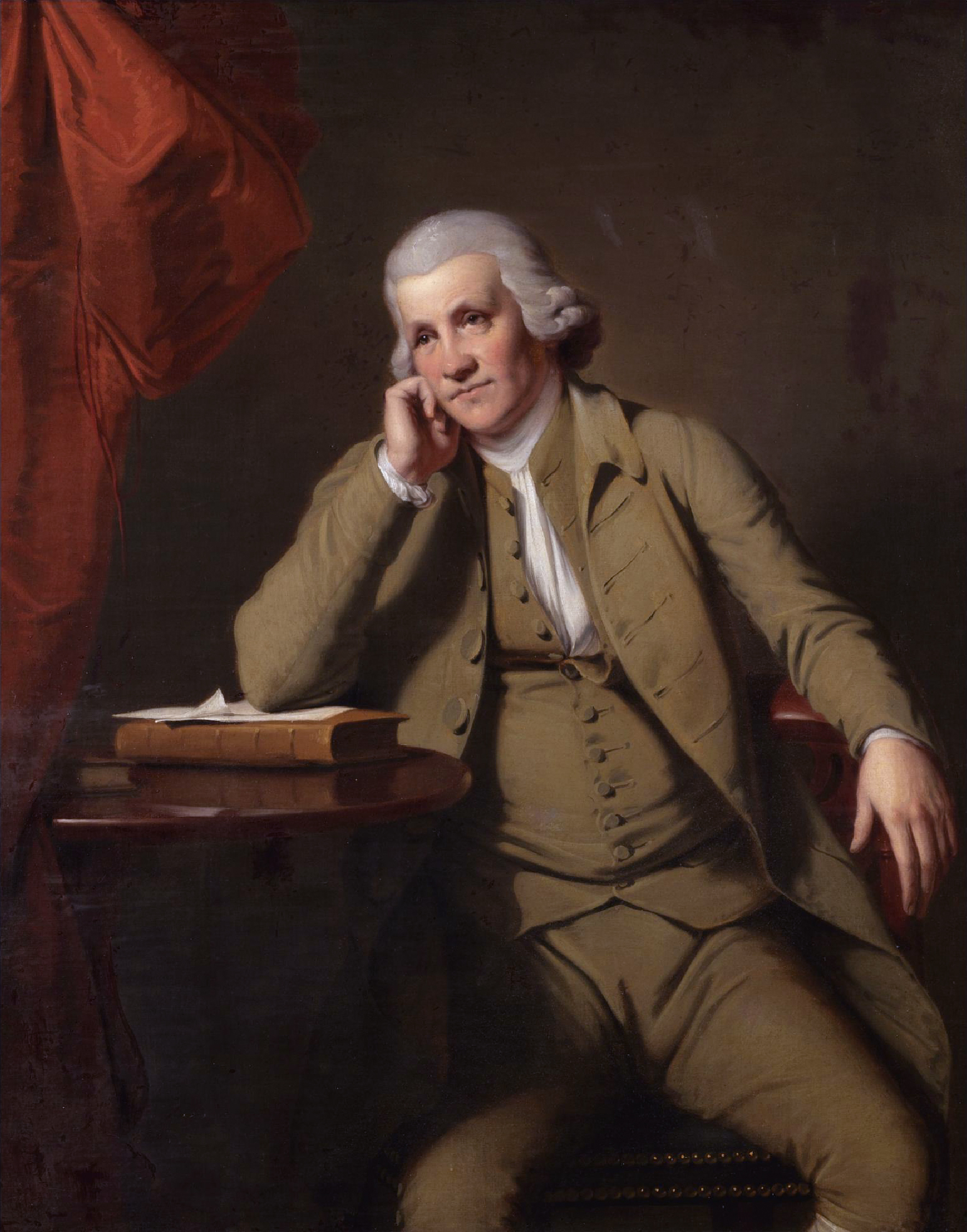
- Portrait of Jedediah Strutt by Joseph Wright of Derby, 1790
- Born: 1726; South Normanton, Alfreton, Derbyshire, England
- Died: 7 May 1797 (aged 70–71)
- Occupations: Hosier, cotton spinner, and industrialist
- Known for: One of the first industrialists who fronted the textile industry.
- Spouses: Elizabeth Woollatt (m. 1755; died 1774) Anne Daniels (m. 1781)
- Children: William, George, Joseph, Elizabeth and Martha

Jedediah Strutt (1726 – 7 May 1797) or Jedidiah Strutt – as he spelled it – was a hosier and cotton spinner from Belper, England.

Strutt and his brother-in-law William Woollat developed an attachment to the stocking frame that allowed the production of ribbed stockings. Their machine became known as the Derby Rib machine, and the stockings it produced quickly became popular.

== Early life ==
He was born to William and Martha Strutt, in South Normanton near Alfreton in Derbyshire, into a farming family in 1726.

In 1740, he became an apprentice wheelwright in Findern. In 1754, he inherited a small stock of animals from an uncle and married Elizabeth Woolatt in 1755 in Derbyshire. He moved to Blackwell where he had inherited a farm from one of his uncles and, in addition developed a business carrying coal from Denby to Belper and Derby.

== The Derby Rib ==
Strutt's brother-in-law, William Woolatt, employed one Mr. Roper of Locko who had produced an idea for an attachment to the stocking frame to knit ribbed stockings. He had made one or two specimens which he showed to his friends, though he lacked the interest (and the capital) to develop his idea. Woolatt conferred with Strutt, who sold a horse and paid Roper £5 for his invention. Strutt and Woolatt turned the device into a viable machine and took out a patent in 1759.

Their machine became known as the Derby Rib machine, and the stockings it produced quickly became popular. Cotton was cheaper than silk and more comfortable than wool but demand was far exceeding supply.

== Cotton mills ==
Strutt and another spinner, Samuel Need, were introduced to Richard Arkwright who had arrived in Nottingham in about 1768, and set up his spinning frame there using horse-power to run the mill, but this was an unsatisfactory power source. In Derby, John Lombe had built a successful silk spinning mill using water power. Strutt and Need joined Arkwright in the building of a cotton mill at Cromford, using what was henceforth called Arkwright's water frame. This was the first of its kind in the world, marking the beginning of the Industrial Revolution.

Strutt bought land in 1777 for his first mill in Belper, which at that time was a hamlet of framework knitters and nail makers. In 1781 he bought the old forge at Makeney by Milford Bridge from Walter Mather. Belper opened in 1778 and Milford in 1782. For each he built long rows of substantial worker's houses and both are now part of the Derwent Valley Mills World Heritage Site.

In time there would be eight Strutt mills at Belper which would grow to a population of 10,000 by the mid-nineteenth century and be the second largest town in the county.

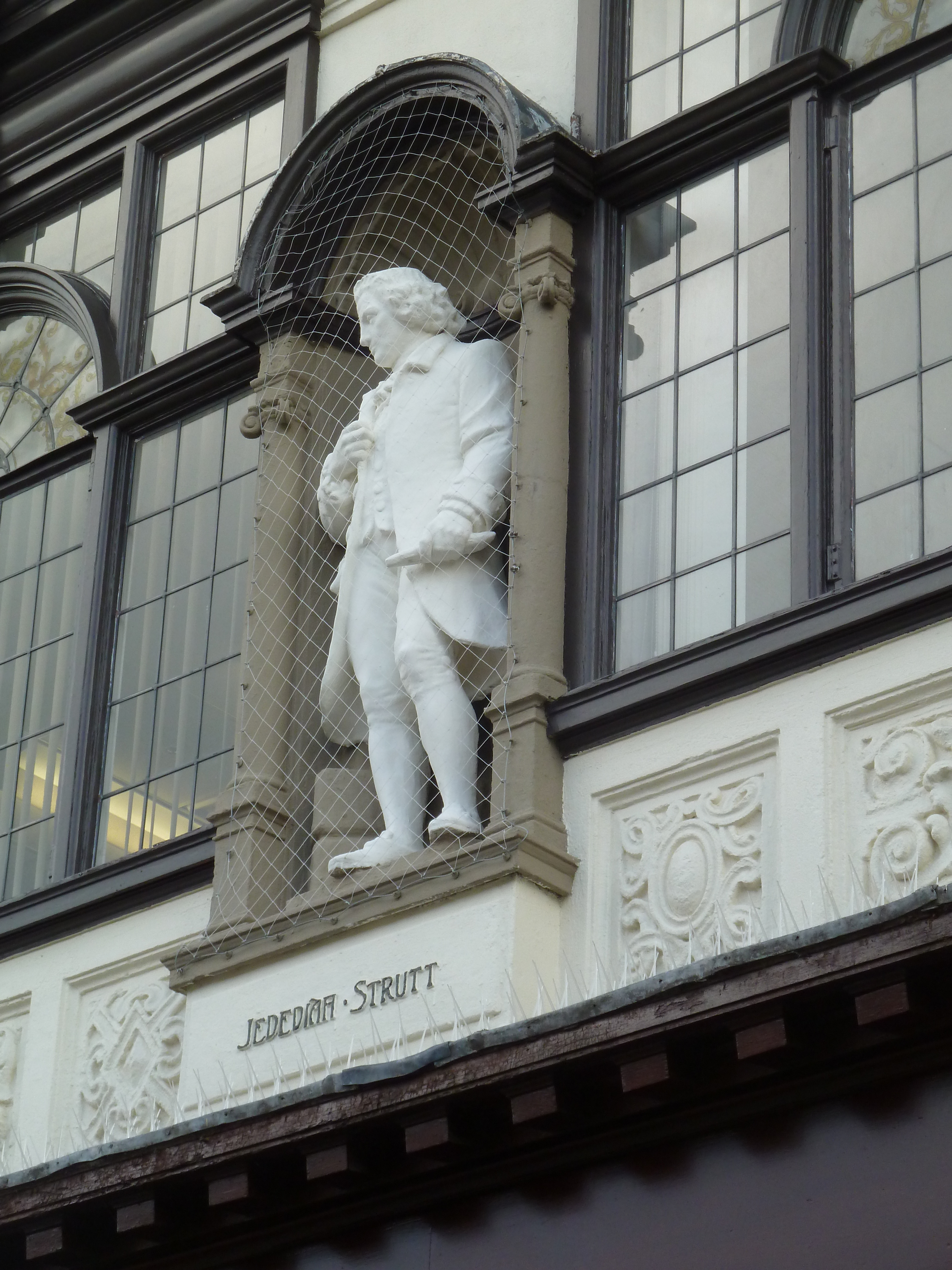
Statue of Jedediah Strutt on the Boots building, East Street, Derby

== Family ==
Strutt was the second son of William Strutt of South Normanton and Martha Statham of Handley near Shottle, Derbyshire, England. In 1755, he married Elizabeth Woollatt. They had five children before Elizabeth's death in London in 1774. In 1781, Strutt married again, to Ann Cantrell, the widow of George Daniels of Belper. There were no children from this marriage.

Jedediah and Elizabeth's children were:

- William (1756–1830), who married Barbara Evans, daughter of Thomas Evans (by his second wife), and who invented the Belper stove. Their son was the Liberal politician Edward Strutt, 1st Baron Belper.
- Elizabeth (1758–1836), who married William Evans, son of Thomas Evans (by his first wife).
- Martha (1760–1793), who married Samuel Fox.
- George Benson (1761–1841), who married Catherine Radford, daughter of Anthony Radford of Holbrook.
- Joseph (1765–1844), who married Isabella Douglas, daughter of Archibold Douglas.

Jedediah died, in Derby, on 7 May 1797, after 'a lingering illness', and is buried in the Unitarian Chapel in Field Row, Belper, which he had built in 1788/9. His final home, Friar Gate House, Derby, is marked with a blue plaque. The house was designed by his son, William Strutt.

== See also ==
- Baron Belper
