= All Saints Church, Wellington =

Church in Shropshire, England

- All Saints Church, Wellington
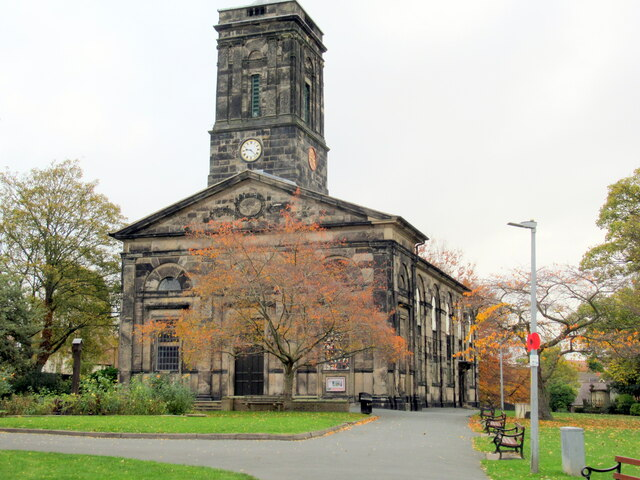
- The parish church of All Saints in Wellington

- Located in Shropshire
- 52.702042°N 2.517782°W
- OS grid reference: SJ 65111 11719
- Location: Wellington, Telford and Wrekin
- Country: England
- Denomination: Church of England
- Website: www.allsaints-wellington.org.uk

History
- Status: Active
- Founded: 1790
- Dedication: All Saints
- Dedicated: 1758
- Consecrated: 1758

Architecture
- Functional status: Parish Church
- Heritage designation: Grade II*
- Designated: April 1983
- Architect: George Steuart
- Style: Neoclassical
- Completed: 1758
- Construction cost: £3,755.14 (1748)

Specifications
- Capacity: 300

Administration
- Province: Canterbury
- Diocese: Lichfield
- Parish: Wellington

Clergy
- Vicar: Revd Tim Carter
- Priest: Revd Ellie Cheetham-Wilkinson

All Saints Church is the Church of England parish church of Wellington in the borough of Telford and Wrekin in Shropshire, England. It is in the Diocese of Lichfield, and is an active place of worship and community hub for the town and outlying areas. The church is grade II* listed, and sits a short distance north of Wellington town centre, close to both the Wolverhampton–Shrewsbury line and Wellington railway station.

== History ==
All Saints Church has undergone three separate rebuilds during its existence. The present building is the third incarnation of the church to occupy the same site as the previous two incarnations over the past thousand years. The original church building existed until the outbreak of the English Civil War and was subsequently damaged by both Oliver Cromwell and Charles I's men. A replacement church was first considered in the 1740s, but the present church was not built until around 1790. Edward Pryce Owen served as vicar from 1823 until 1841. The church underwent refurbishments and extensions in 1898. The church was given Grade II* listed status by Historic England in April 1983. In 2017, the church was one of many parish churches across the United Kingdom to take part in the BBC's Music Day UK by ringing the bells.

== Architecture ==
The church was designed by George Steuart in Neoclassical style. It is built in Grinshill stone, a type of sandstone, and consists of a nave with an apse and a tower behind the west front. The west front has three bays with giant Tuscan pilasters carrying a pediment. In the centre is a doorway flanked by windows, all with square heads, and above are lunettes. The tower has two stages with paired Ionic pilasters, clock faces, and a small dome. Along the sides of the church are two tiers of windows, the upper windows round-headed, and in the apse is a tripartite pilastered window. Inside the church are galleries on three sides. A memorial chapel has a wooden screen on which are listed names of men of the congregation who died in the Second World War and there are also three war memorial tablets to different men (Thomas Elcocks, 2nd Lieutenant William Hodgson and Captain St John Meyrick) who died serving in the Boer War.

== Lychgate ==
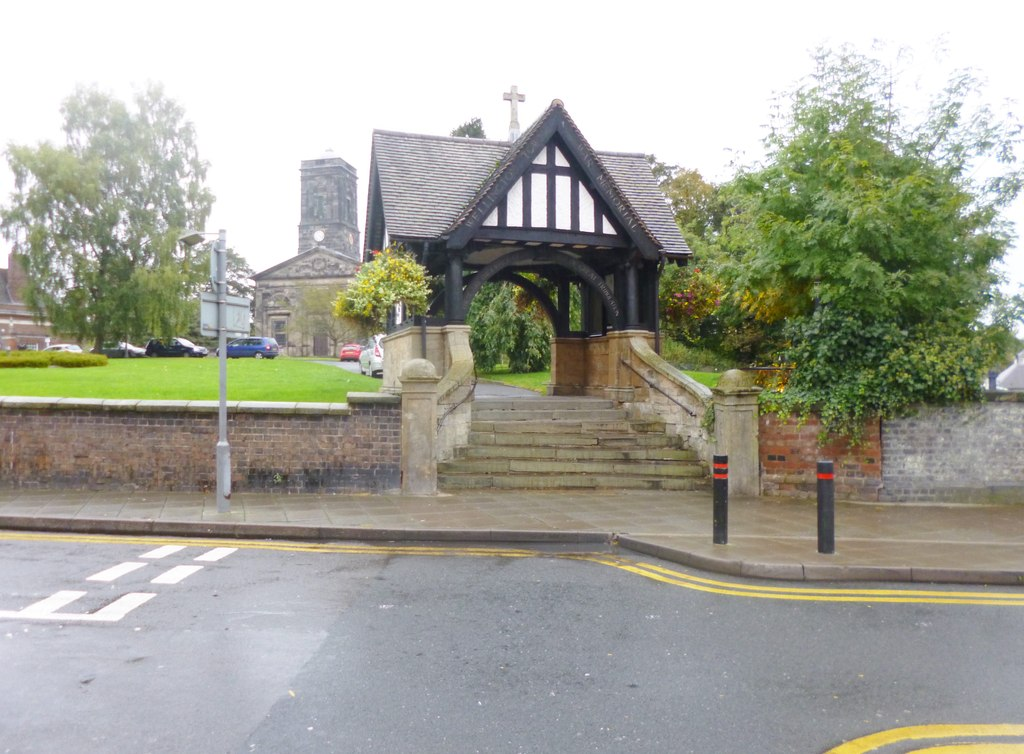
The Grade II listed lychgate in All Saints Church grounds off Church Street, Wellington

The gate piers flank the southwest entrance to the churchyard, from Church Street, and were built in the late 18th or early 19th century. They are in stone, and have a panelled frieze, a moulded cornice, and a hemispherical cap. Steps flanked by coped stone walls lead up to a memorial lychgate that was added in 1922. The lychgate has stone walls, a timber superstructure with round arches, a timber framed gable with a cross finial, and a tiled roof. On the arches are inscriptions, and on the inside walls are bronze plaques with inscriptions and the names of those lost in the two World Wars, as well as one man each who died in the Malayan Emergency and the Korean War. The "Gate Piers, Steps, Walls and War Memorial Lychgate" are grade II listed as one entity.

== See also ==
- Listed buildings in Wellington, Shropshire
- Grade II* listed buildings in Shropshire
