= Mary Knight =

Mary Knight may refer to:

- Mary Ann Knight (1776–1851), English painter
- Mary M. Knight (1854–1940), Washington state pioneer and educator
- Mary Knight (singer) (1631–?), English singer and poet

== See also ==
- May Night, an 1880 Russian comic opera
- Mary Nighy (born 1984), English actress and filmmaker
