= Wellington, Shropshire =

Market town in Shropshire, England

Coordinates: 52.7001°N 2.5157°W

Wellington
- Town and civil parish
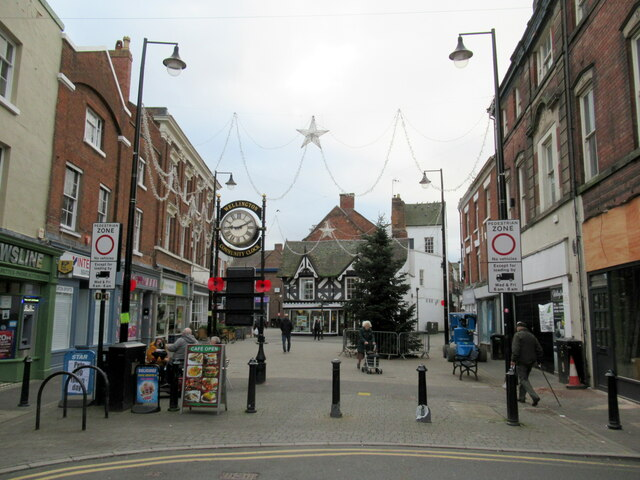
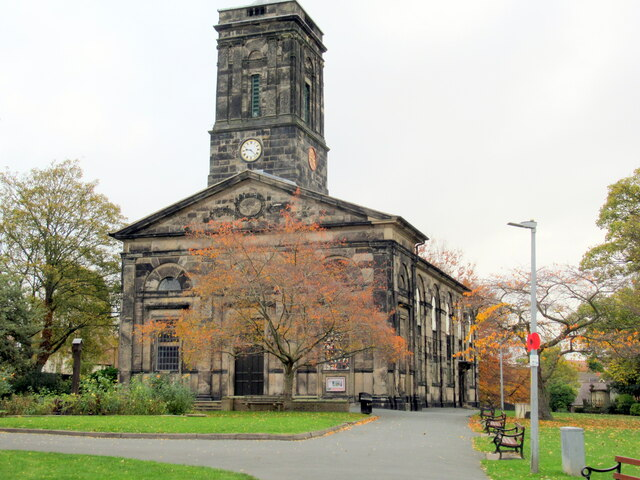
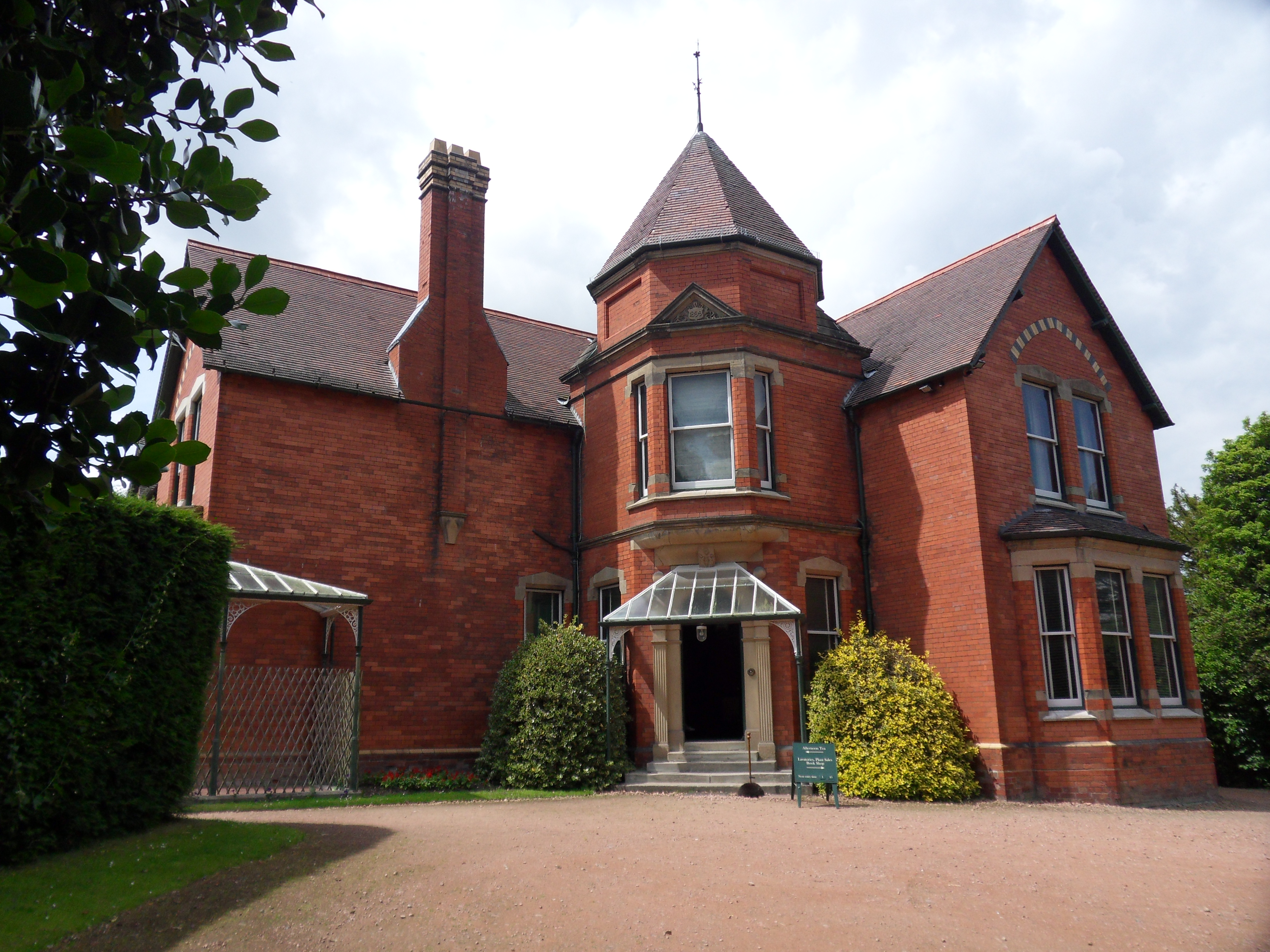
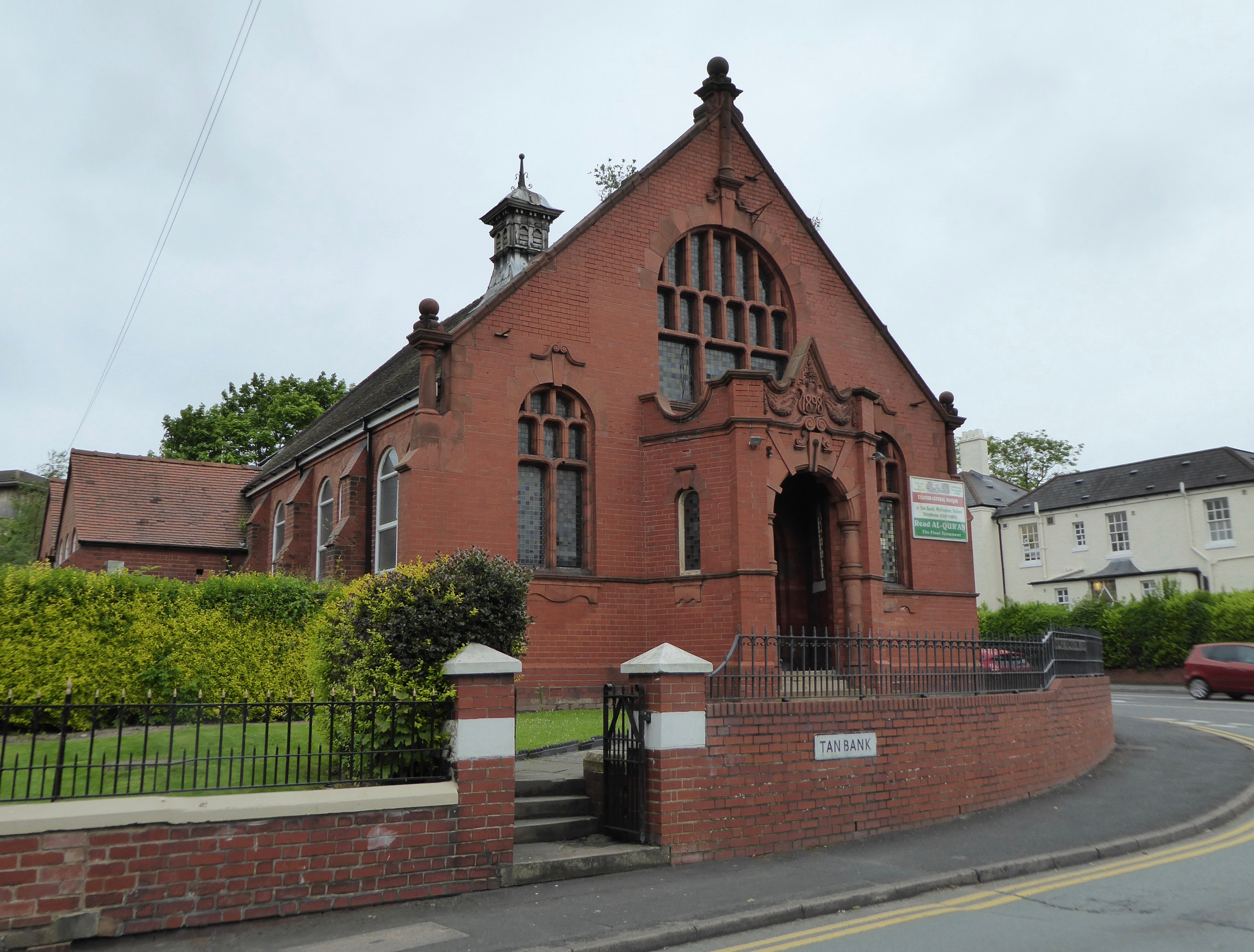
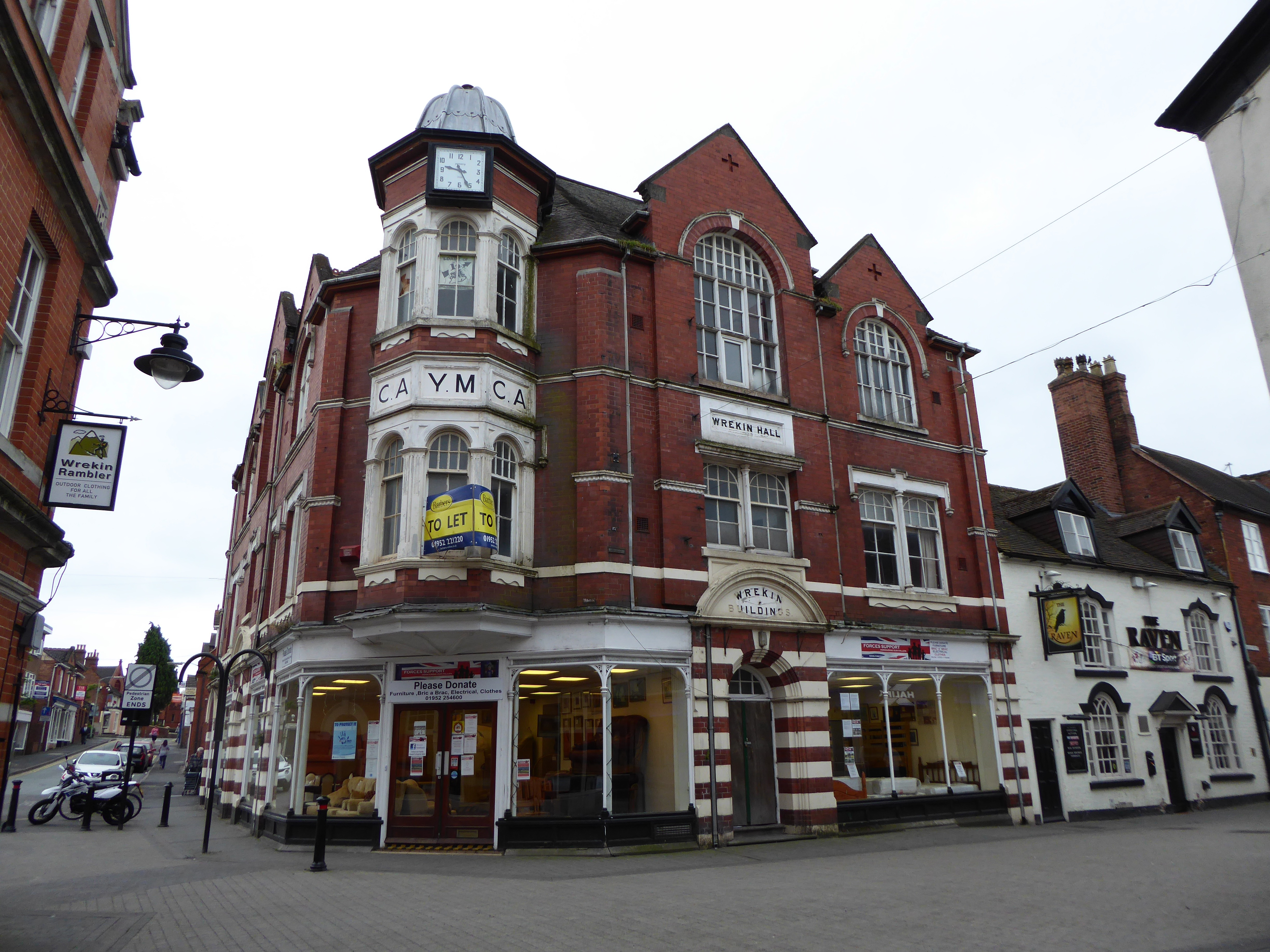
- Clockwise from the top: Wellington Market Street, Sunnycroft, Wrekin Buildings, Central Mosque and All Saints Church

- Parish coat of arms

- Location within Shropshire
- Population: 25,554
- OS grid reference: SJ651115
- Civil parish: Wellington
- Unitary authority: Telford and Wrekin
- Ceremonial county: Shropshire
- Region: West Midlands
- Country: England
- Sovereign state: United Kingdom
- Areas of the town: List: Admaston; Arleston; Bratton; Dothill; Ercall
- Post town: TELFORD
- Postcode district: TF1
- Dialling code: 01952
- Police: West Mercia
- Fire: Shropshire
- Ambulance: West Midlands
- UK Parliament: The Wrekin
- Website: www.wellington-shropshire.gov.uk

Wellington is a market town and a civil parish in the borough of Telford and Wrekin, Shropshire, England. It is situated 3 miles (4.8 km) north-west of Telford and 12 miles (19 km) east of Shrewsbury, near the western terminus of the M54 motorway. The summit of The Wrekin lies 3 miles to the south-west. Wellington’s population was 25,554 in the 2011 census.

== Etymology ==
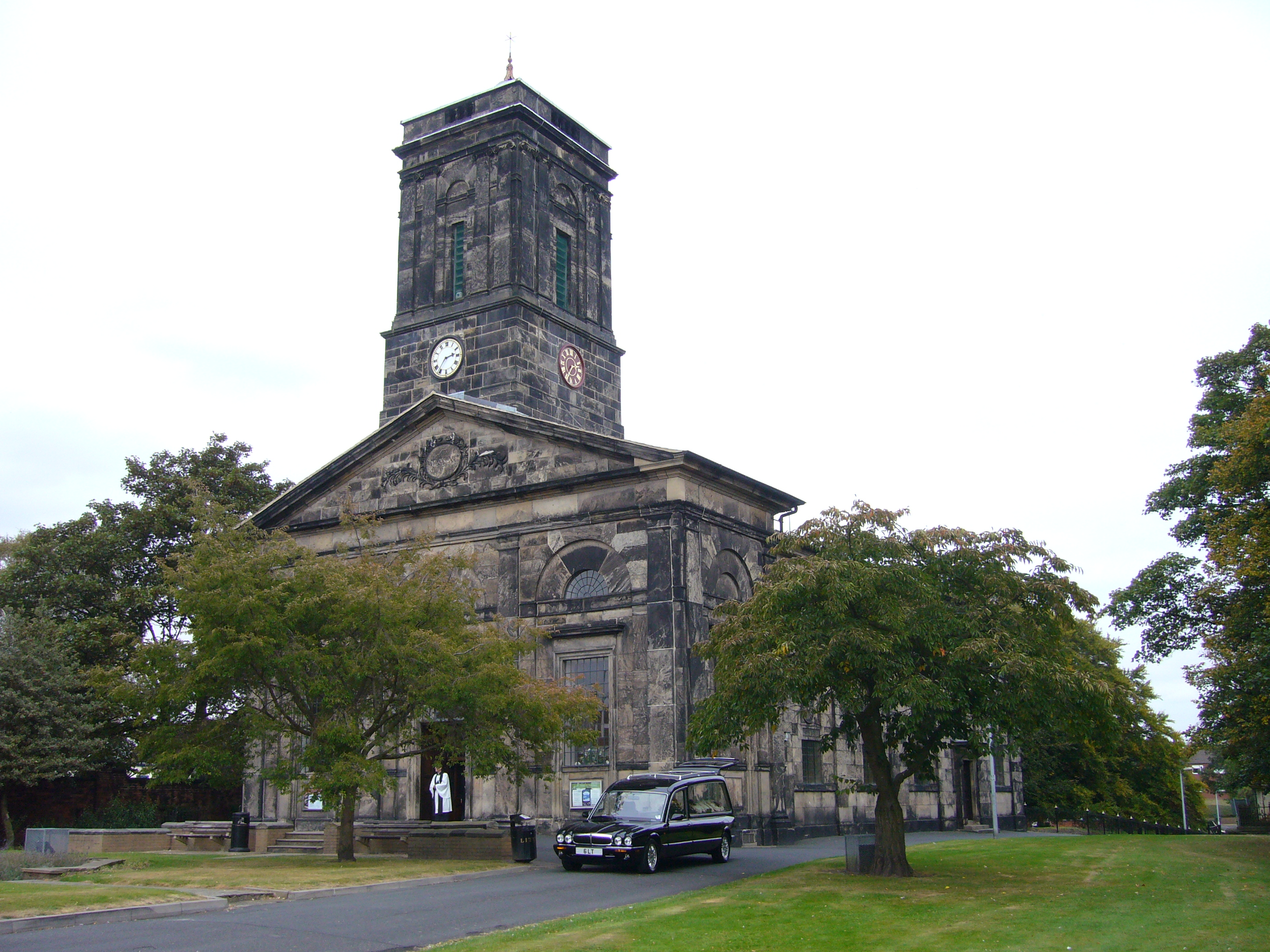
All Saints' Church in the centre of Wellington, built in 1789

The origin of the name Wellington is the subject of debate. One theory derives it from the Old English weolaingtūn meaning 'settlement connected with Weola'. Other theories derive it from waluingtūn meaning 'settlement at the walled place' or wēohlēahtūn meaning 'holy settlement in a wood or clearing'. Alternatively, the first element could be wēoling meaning 'mechanical device'.

== History ==
A church has stood for almost 1,000 years and a priest is mentioned in the Domesday Book. The original churchyard still remains. All Saints Church was designed by George Steuart and was built in 1789.

Wellington's first market charter was granted to Giles of Erdington, lord of the manor, in 1244 and a market still exists today. The market had an open-sided market hall by 1680, and possibly much earlier, but it was dismantled in about 1805. In 1841 a market company was formed to purchase the market rights from Lord Forester in 1856. In 1848, the company built a town hall with the butter market below, creating a permanent covered space for traders.

The first Shropshire Olympian Games, organised by celebrated Olympic revivalist Dr William Penny Brookes, were held in Wellington in May 1861. In August 1868, the town hosted the third National Olympian Games, organised by the National Olympian Association co-founded by Brookes, when their intended venue at Manchester had become unavailable.

To the north-east of the town is the site of Apley Castle, originally a 14th-century fortified manor house; the remains were converted into a stable block with the building of a grand Georgian house, which was itself demolished in 1955. The surviving stable block has been converted into apartments and retains some medieval features.

=== The creation of Telford ===
A map of Telford; Wellington is shown in magenta

Dawley New Town was designated by the government in 1963 and was expanded to encompass Wellington in 1968; it was given the new name of Telford, after the great engineer and first county surveyor of Shropshire, Thomas Telford. The creation of Telford has divided opinion in Wellington ever since, with some celebrating the jobs and investment it brought to the area and others bemoaning the negative impact on Wellington's own economy; as well as its status and sense of identity. The development of Telford Town Centre and local retail parks since the 1970s had an adverse effect on Wellington's retail centre. The local football team's name was changed from Wellington Town to Telford United in 1969.

For many years, local politics left Wellington in conflict with Wrekin District (now Telford and Wrekin Council), with claims and counterclaims of neglect. In the 21st century, however, the borough council has invested heavily in the town. These investments include the redeveloped Wellington Civic and Leisure Centre, near the centre of the town, which has brought together the library, town council, swimming pool and gym, along with a modern register office. Two hundred borough council officers are also located at the new complex.

== Commerce ==
The area's largest employers are located in nearby areas of Telford, with Wellington itself housing hundreds of small businesses in its shops, offices and small manufacturing units. A range of nationwide chains have branches in Wellington; the Wrekin Retail Park is located in the town.

== Attractions ==
The Wrekin, one of Shropshire's most famous landmarks, is the most northern part of the Shropshire Hills Area of Outstanding Natural Beauty. Located just 2.5 miles (4.0 km) from the centre of Wellington, it attracts tens of thousands of walkers and cyclists to the town every year.

Located in the town's Victorian market hall, Wellington Market operates four days a week and houses over 50 stalls.

A short walk from the centre of the town is Sunnycroft, a Victorian villa and mini-estate now owned and run by the National Trust.

The town is home to the Belfrey Theatre, an amateur venue run by the Wellington Theatre Company, which offers an annual season of plays and other shows.

== Transport ==
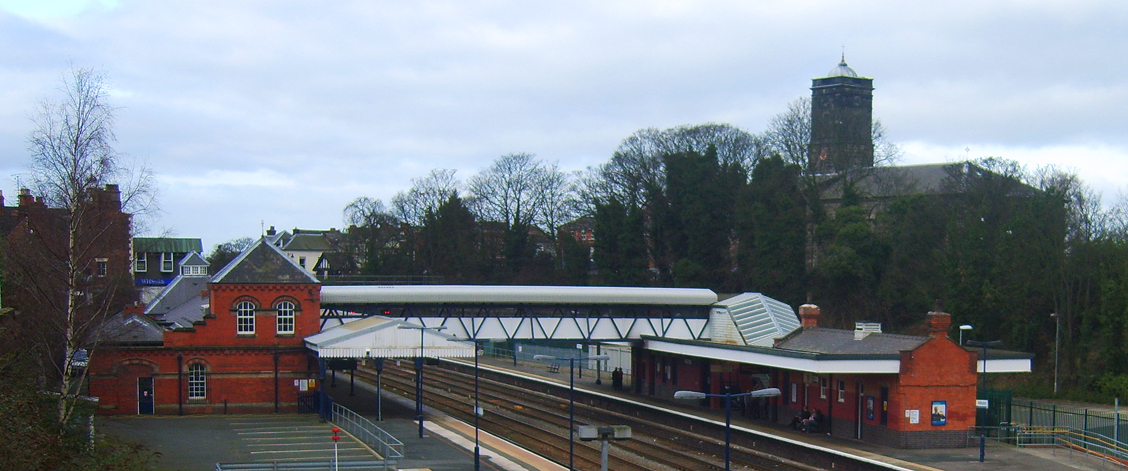
Wellington railway station

Wellington has road links, centrally located railway and bus stations, and a position on routes 45 and 81 of the National Cycle Network.

=== Railway ===
Wellington railway station is served by two train operating companies:

- Transport for Wales operates hourly services between Birmingham International and West Wales; destinations alternate between Aberystwyth and Pwllheli, and Holyhead
- West Midlands Trains operates hourly services each way between Shrewsbury and Birmingham New Street, via Wolverhampton.

==== History ====
The station was built in 1849. In 1867, a branch line was opened to connect the town with Market Drayton. The Wellington and Market Drayton Railway operated for almost a hundred years before closure under the Beeching Axe in 1963. The line remained open for goods only services until 1967; the track was lifted in 1970.

There were also railway links to Much Wenlock, closed in 1962, and Stafford, which closed in the late 1960s.

A goods only link to a rail head at Donnington, on part of the former Wellington to Stafford line, has been reopened. There have been campaigns to reopen the whole of the line from Shrewsbury to Stafford through Wellington, Leegomery, Hadley, Trench, Donnington and Newport.

=== Buses ===
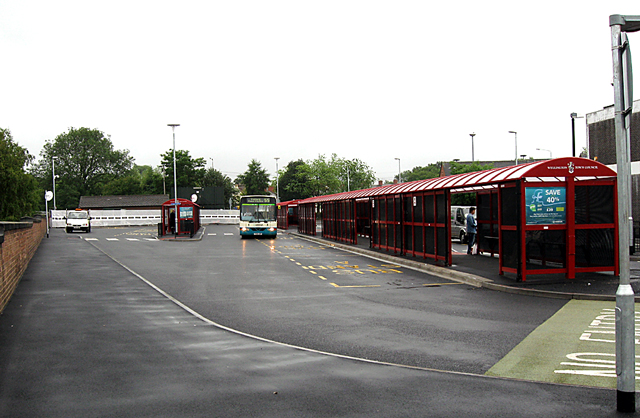
Wellington bus station, prior to its redesign in 2022

Current bus services operated by Arriva Midlands in Wellington are:

- 4: Madeley – Leegomery
- 7: Wellington – Telford Centre
- X7: Telford Centre – Shrewsbury
- 8: Telford/Wellington – Bridgnorth
- X10A: Telford Centre – Shrewsbury
- 99 – Telford circular.

In late 2022, Telford and Wrekin Council introduced the Travel Telford services, operated by Chaserider and Select Bus Services; these are:

- 100: Wellington – Sutton Hill
- 101: Madeley – Princess Royal Hospital
- 102/3: Wellington – Newport.

==== History ====
After World War I, BMMO expanded its depots out from Birmingham to other towns and cities in the Midlands, including Shrewsbury. Thus would later lead to them opening a depot on Charlton Street on 21 July 1932, after closing the Shrewsbury depot in the same month. BMMO was later renamed to Midland Red Omnibus Company in March 1974 and was split up in September 1981 to become Midland Red (North) Limited, with whom the depot was taken control of.

Midland Red North was later acquired by the Cowie Group on 1 August 1996, which would rename it to become Arriva on 6 November 1997.

After 80 years of the Charlton Street depot being in operation, it would be closed by Arriva in April 2012 and demolished in summer of 2015. The fleet and staff from the depot were moved to a new premises on Stafford Park prior to its demolition.

== Events ==
The area's music and theatre groups host performances throughout the year, and there are craft markets at both Belmont Hall and Christ Church.

In March, the town marks Charter Day, when the 1244 charter is delivered by a messenger on horseback. A jury then convenes in the Market Square to appoint the town crier, ale taster and market clerk for the year ahead.

During the summer, around 40 events take place in and around the town; these include the historically inspired Midsummer Fayre, the town carnival and Lions Day at Bowring Park, and the Wellington Walking Festival. Sounds in The Square brings live music to the heart of the town across weekends in July and August, and various concerts and fetes complete the programme.

The Wellington Arts Festival runs every October and offers a variety of events including plays, music, exhibitions, literature and poetry.

== Education and health services ==
Wellington is the main education centre for the borough. Telford College and the independent school Wrekin College are located around the outskirts of the town, along with several primary and secondary schools.

The Princess Royal Hospital, one of Shropshire's two main hospitals, is located just outside the town at Apley, as is the Severn Hospice. Within the town, Wellington Health Centre is the main GP practice.

The former cottage hospital was endowed in 1910 by Ann Bowring, in memory of her husband John, a successful fish merchant and railway entrepreneur. The hospital, which opened on the Haygate Road in 1913, was used as a military auxiliary hospital during World War I. Threatened with closure in 1919, it was saved by local fundraising and continued to serve as a local hospital and later a care home, under the regional Health Board.

== Media ==
Local news and television programmes are provided by BBC West Midlands and ITV Central. Television signals are received from the Wrekin TV transmitter.

Local radio stations are BBC Radio Shropshire, Hits Radio Black Country & Shropshire, Greatest Hits Radio Black Country & Shropshire and Capital North West and Wales.

The town is served by local newspaper, Shropshire Star.

== Community projects ==
A number of community organisations are active in the town, including the Walkers are Welcome group and Wellington H2A, which promotes arts and heritage in the town through a range of events. Local history and heritage are promoted by Wellington History Group and the Civic Society.

Amongst current community projects are the Peace Garden, started by local nonagenarian George Evans (died 2020), and the ambitious project to return a cinema to the town for the first time since the closure of the Clifton almost three decades ago. In June 2019, the Wellington Orbit was opened, bringing a cafe, bar and cinema to the centre of the town; it is operated by a team of volunteers.

== Sport ==
The New Buck's Head football stadium, home to AFC Telford United, is in Wellington. Other sporting clubs include the Wellington Cricket Club, currently in the Birmingham League Premier Division, and Wrekin Golf Club.

== Twin towns ==
Wellington is twinned with Châtenay-Malabry, France. A twinning group exists to maintain links with the town.

== Notable people ==
The town's literary claims to fame include it being the birthplace of 19th-century evangelical religious writer Hesba Stretton (1832–1911), and the first job of poet Philip Larkin (1922–1985) was as librarian of Wellington Library from 1943 to 1946. Larkin described Wellington as a "hole full of toad's turds" and stated that his job as town librarian was to "hand out tripey novels to morons". A walkway at the side of Wellington Library was named Larkin Way in honour of Philip Larkin, but this pathway was lost during redevelopment work on the library. Larkin Way, in a slightly modified form, still exists. The Wellington Civic and Leisure Centre is on Larkin Way.

Reverend Patrick Brontë (1777–1861) lived in the town for a year while serving a curacy before moving to Yorkshire and meeting his future wife there, Maria Branwell (1783–1821), with whom he had four notable Brontë children. The abolitionist Dr William Withering (1741–1799) was born in the town; he investigated digitalis, used in the treatment of heart disease. Several members of the pop group T'Pau (active 1986–1992), including vocalist Carol Decker (born 1957) and keyboardist Michael Chetwood, grew up in Wellington; the latter returning to run a music shop in the town.

Other notable people born, educated or prominent in Wellington are:

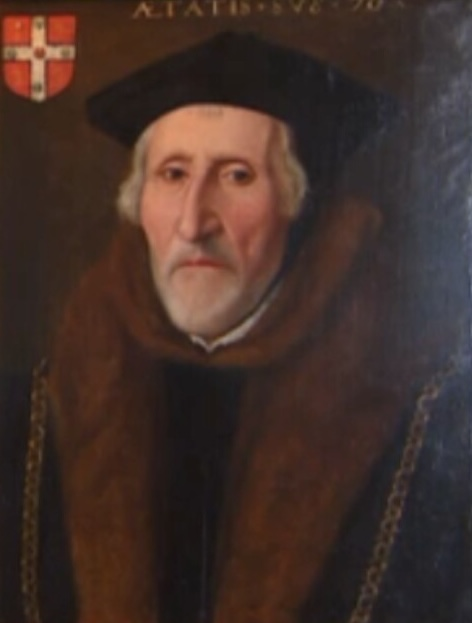
Sir Thomas Leigh

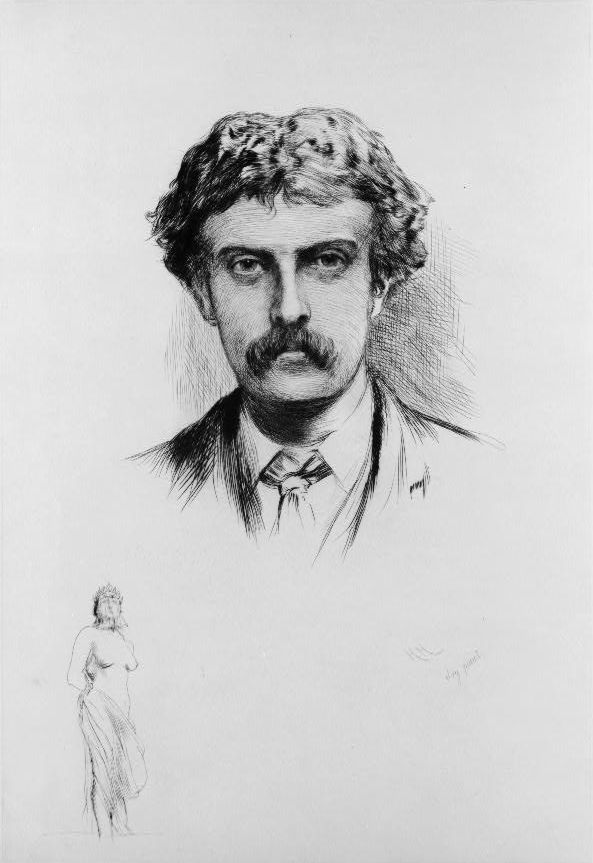
Cecil Gordon Lawson, 1883

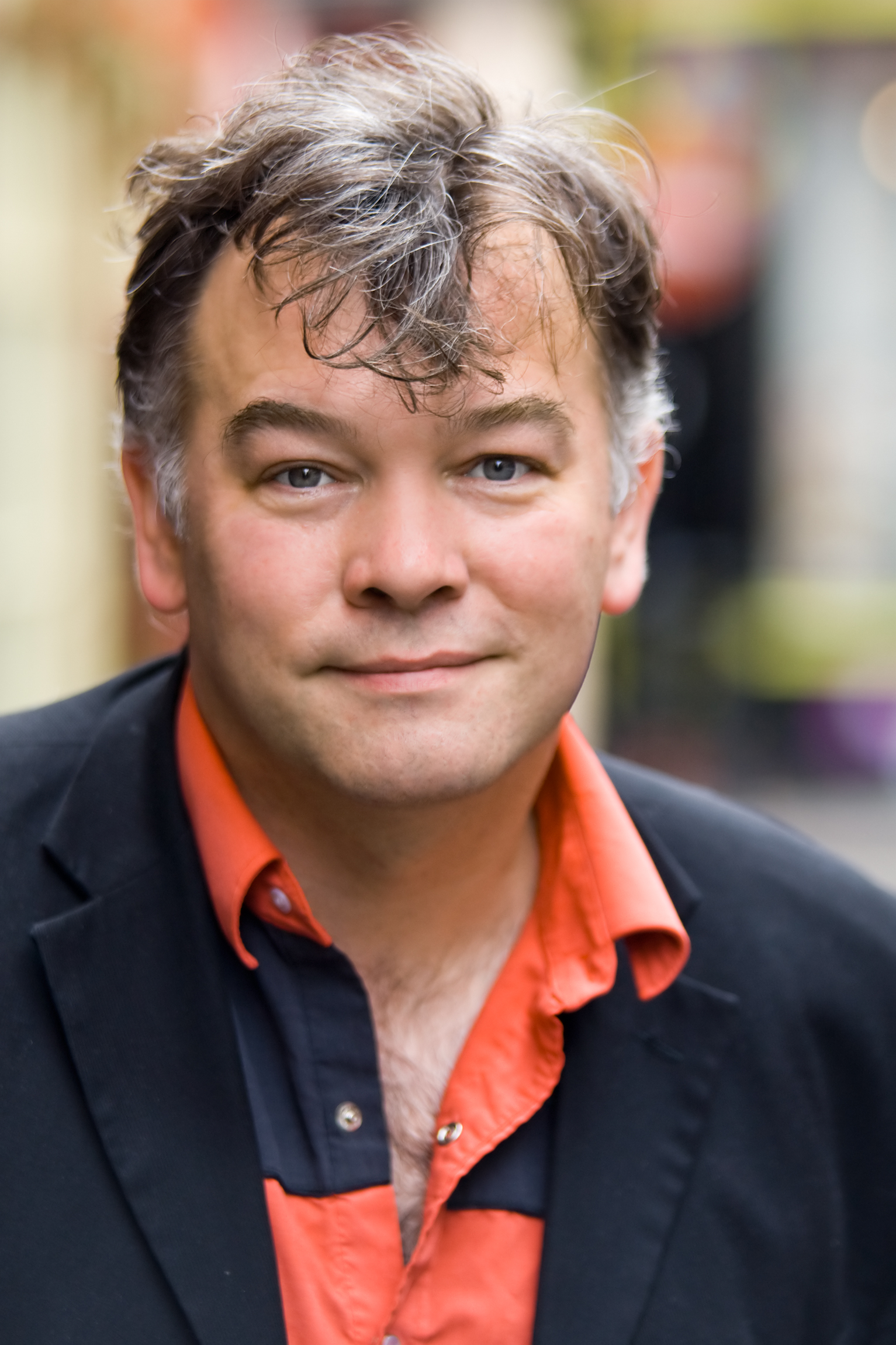
Stewart Lee, 2008

- Thomas Charlton (??-1344), Bishop of Hereford, Lord High Treasurer of England, Lord Privy Seal and Lord Chancellor of Ireland.
- Thomas Leigh (1504–1571), born there, merchant, Lord Mayor of London 1558–59.
- Richard Baxter (1615–1691), puritan church leader and scholar.
- Sir George Downing, 3rd Baronet (1685–1749), politician, founded Downing College, Cambridge. He was brought up by his maternal aunt at Dothill Park, her husband being politician Sir William Forester (1655–1718).
- Nathaniel Plimer (1757–1822) and Andrew Plimer (1763–1837), brothers, painters of miniatures.
- Edward Pryce Owen (1788–1863), artist, was vicar of Wellington 1823–1840.
- Richard Padmore (1789–1881), Liberal politician and industrialist, born there
- Henry John Gauntlett (1805–1876), composer, organist and organ designer, born there when his father Henry Gauntlett (1762–1833) was curate at the parish church
- Thomas Campbell Eyton JP, DL (1809–1880), naturalist who studied cattle, fishes and birds.
- Robert William Eyton (1815–1881), antiquary, born there, son of local vicar.
- John Dickson (circa 1819–1892), railway contractor, lived in Wellington between 1847 and 1854 before relocating to South Wales.
- Cecil Gordon Lawson (1849–1882), landscape artist, born there.
- Lonsdale Ragg (1866–1945), clergyman and writer who became Archdeacon of Gibraltar, born there.
- David Cranage (1866–1957), Church of England clergyman who became Dean of Norwich and writer.
- William Allison White (1894–1974), World War I Victoria Cross recipient, died there.
- George Ambler Wilson (1906–1977), civil engineer, born there.
- George King (1919–1997), New Age thinker or mystagogue, founded the Aetherius Society, born there.
- Len Murray (1922–2004), General Secretary of the Trades Union Congress from 1973 to 1984, educated at Wellington Grammar School.
- Peter Vaughan (1923–2016) actor, lived in Wellington before moving to Staffordshire at age seven.
- Brian Epstein (1934–1967), manager of The Beatles studied the violin at Wrekin College for two years.
- Gerry Fowler (1935–1993), Labour Party politician, lived there while MP for The Wrekin and local councillor.
- Nigel Rogers (1936–2022), tenor opera singer and musical conductor, born there.
- Paulette Wilson (1956–2020), immigration rights activist, grew up here when parents arrived from Jamaica.
- Richard Cousins (1959–2017), businessman, CEO Compass Group, lived here in the late 1980s and was active in its local Cricket Club.
- Stewart Lee (born 1968), comedian, born there.
- Paul Blackthorne (born 1969), American-based actor, born there.

=== Sport ===
- John Parton (1863–1906), cricketer, born there
- Jackery Jones (1877–1945), footballer, born there, played for 314 games for Wolves.
- Billy Scarratt (1878–1958), footballer, born and died there, played notably for Shrewsbury Town.
- Watty Corbett (1880–1960), footballer, born there; player for Aston Villa and England, won team gold medal in 1908 Summer Olympics.
- Charlie Millington (1882–1945), footballer who played over 160 games for Aston Villa, Fulham and Birmingham City, died there.
- Harry Hampton (1885–1963), footballer, born there, played 410 games, played for Wellington Town and 339 games for Aston Villa.
- Tommy Pritchard (1904–1968), footballer, born there, played over 150 games, especially for Wolves and Charlton Athletic.
- Des Fawcett (1905–1968), footballer who played 336 matches for six clubs, ending with Wellington Town; died there.
- Susan Partridge (1930–1999), Wimbledon Championships tennis player, born there
- Tommy Nicholls (1931–2021), featherweight boxer who competed at 1952 and 1956 Olympics, where he won silver
- Peter Thornley (born 1941), professional wrestler, born there, best known as the ring character Kendo Nagasaki
- Charles Pritchard (born 1962), cricketer, born there.
- Tony Parton (born 1967), cricketer, born there.
- Adam Byram (born 1971), cricketer, born there.
- Kamran Sheeraz (born 1973), cricketer, born there.
- Adam Proudlock (born 1981) football manager and former player in 310 games.

== See also ==
- Listed buildings in Wellington, Shropshire
