= Nathaniel Plimer =

English painter (1757–1822)

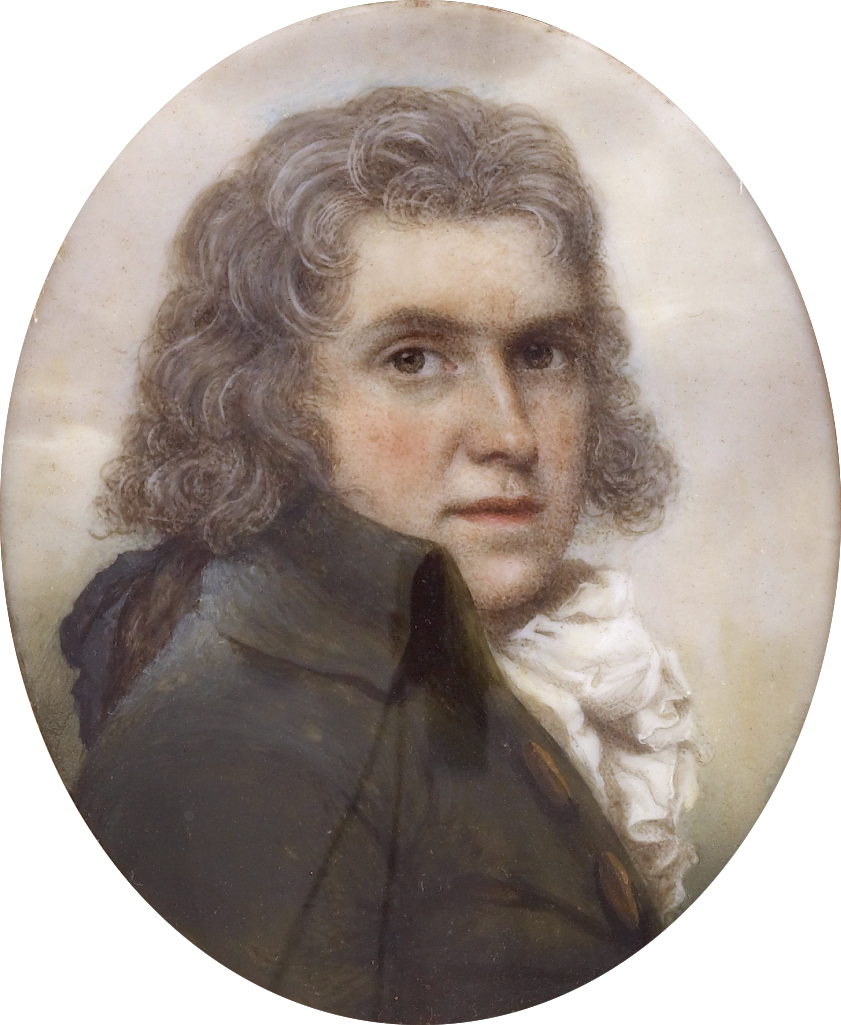
Self-portrait

Nathaniel Plimer (1757–1822) was an English miniature portrait painter.

Plimer was born to a clockmaker, also named Nathaniel, and his wife variously called Mary Elizabeth or Eliza, in Wellington, Shropshire.

He was originally apprenticed as a clockmaker like his brother Andrew but both ran away and travelled for over two years in Wales and the west of England with a troupe of Gypsies before settling in London in 1781. He was apprenticed to Henry Bone the enameler, after working as his manservant, before joining his brother Andrew in studying drawing with Richard Cosway. He exhibited at the Royal Academy from 1787 until 1815. He exhibited twenty-six works. Many of his smaller portraits are highly regarded.

Plimer lived the rest of his life in London apart from about a decade (1804-1814) in Edinburgh, Scotland. Plimer had four children, the youngest of whom, his daughter Adela, married the painter, Andrew Geddes.
