= Edward Pryce Owen =

English artist and clergyman

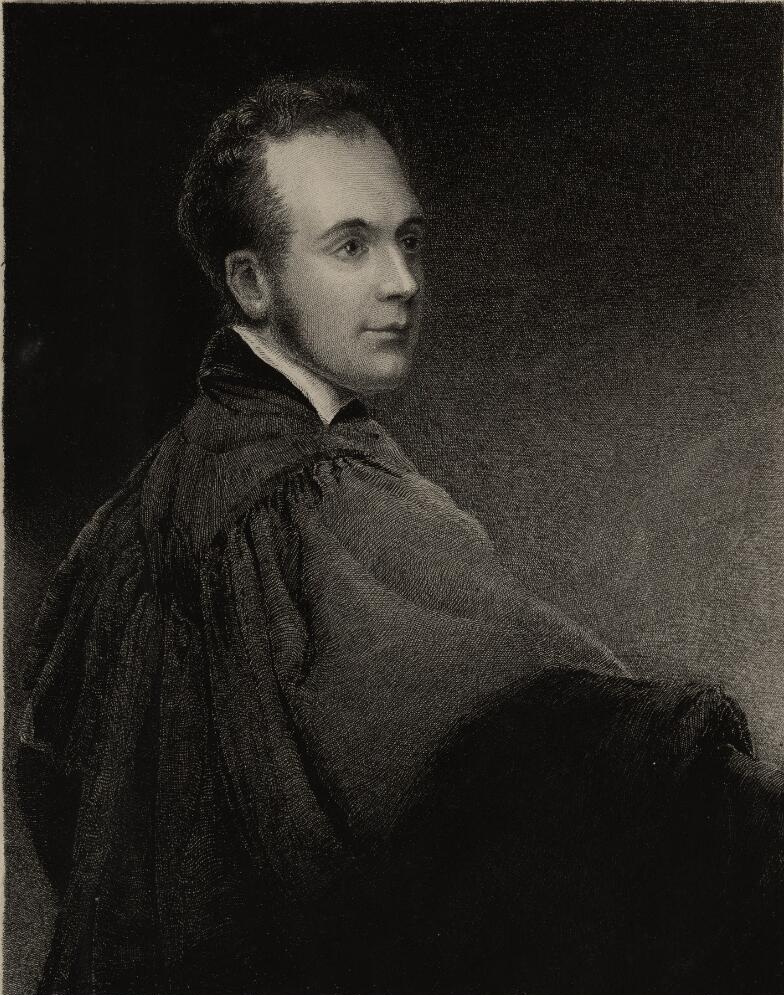
A portrait of Owen from around 1810

Edward Pryce Owen (3 March 1788 – 15 July 1863) was an English artist and Church of England clergyman. He was the only son of Archdeacon Hugh Owen (1761–1827) by his wife Harriett née Jeffreys. He was the twenty-fifth in male descent from Edwin of Tegeingl, founder of the noble tribe of Powis. He was educated at St. John's College, Cambridge, where he graduated with a B.A. in 1810 and an M.A in 1816. After officiating for some time at Park Street Chapel, Grosvenor Square, London, he became vicar of Wellington, and rector of Eyton upon the Weald Moors, Shropshire, holding these livings from 27 February 1823 (Foster, Index Eccles.) till 1840. While travelling in France and Belgium, and (in 1840) in Italy, the Levant, Germany, and Switzerland, he made numerous drawings, from which he afterwards produced etchings and pictures in oils.

He contributed several plates to the ‘History of Shrewsbury,’ 1825, by Hugh Owen (his father) and J. B. Blakeway, and issued the following: 'Etchings of Ancient Buildings in Shrewsbury’ (with letterpress), Nos. 1 and 2 only, London, 1820–1, fol., ‘Etchings’ (portrait and forty-five plates), London, 1826, royal fol.; privately printed, and‘The Book of Etchings,’ vol. i. 1842; vol. ii. 1855.

In the latter part of his life Owen lived at Bettws Hall, Montgomeryshire. He died aged 75 at Cheltenham on 15 July 1863.
