= Sunnycroft =

Coordinates: 52°41′43″N 2°31′0″W

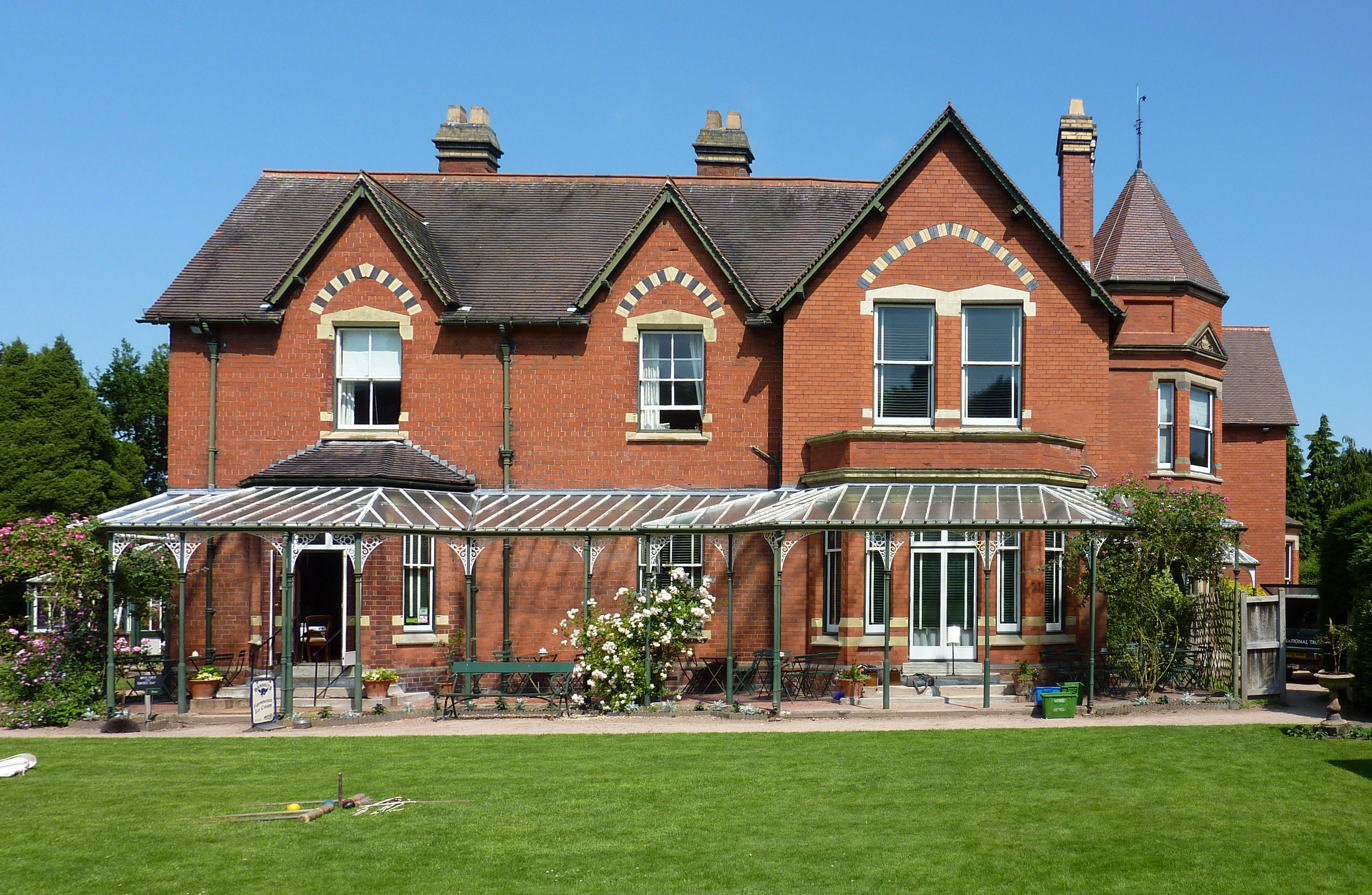
- View of Sunnycroft from the lawn
- Interactive map of the Sunnycroft area

General information
- Architectural style: Victorian
- Location: Wellington, Shropshire, England
- Construction started: 1880
- Completed: 1899
- Owner: National Trust

Sunnycroft is a Victorian suburban villa, located in Wellington, Shropshire, and owned by the National Trust.

== Location ==
The house is located in the market town of Wellington, Shropshire, England, close to the town centre, on the B5061 Holyhead Road, originally the Shrewsbury to London road, and formerly part of Watling Street the Roman road from London to Wroxeter.

== History ==
Suburban villas were almost 'country estates in miniature' which attempted to emulate upper class mansions on a middle class budget. Many have either been modernised, renovated or refurbished out of recognition over the last 60 years or so or have been demolished and replaced with later housing, converted into offices or residential care homes, or have been broken up into flats and smaller residences.

Sunnycroft was built in 1879 and extended in 1899. It was built by brewer J. G. Wackrill and later owned by Mary Jane Slaney, a local wine and spirit merchant. From 1912 it was owned and occupied by the Lander family, until it was acquired by the National Trust in 1997. Many of the original interior fixtures and fittings remain in place, although electricity was installed by the Lander family. Many original features are still in place and the house therefore has a unique character and intimacy that is often lacking from larger properties but very evocative of its time and place.

The National Trust summarises Sunnycroft as a late 19th-century gentleman's villa, a typical creation of Victorian era suburbia, with:

- a rare unaltered interior, with an elaborate conservatory
- a mini country-estate, with pigsties, stables, kitchen garden and orchards
- colourful borders and summertime flower displays
- a superb long avenue of Redwood trees and lime trees.

== Access ==
As of 2025 the National Trust opens the property to the public on a limited number of occasions and otherwise by appointment.

== Gallery ==
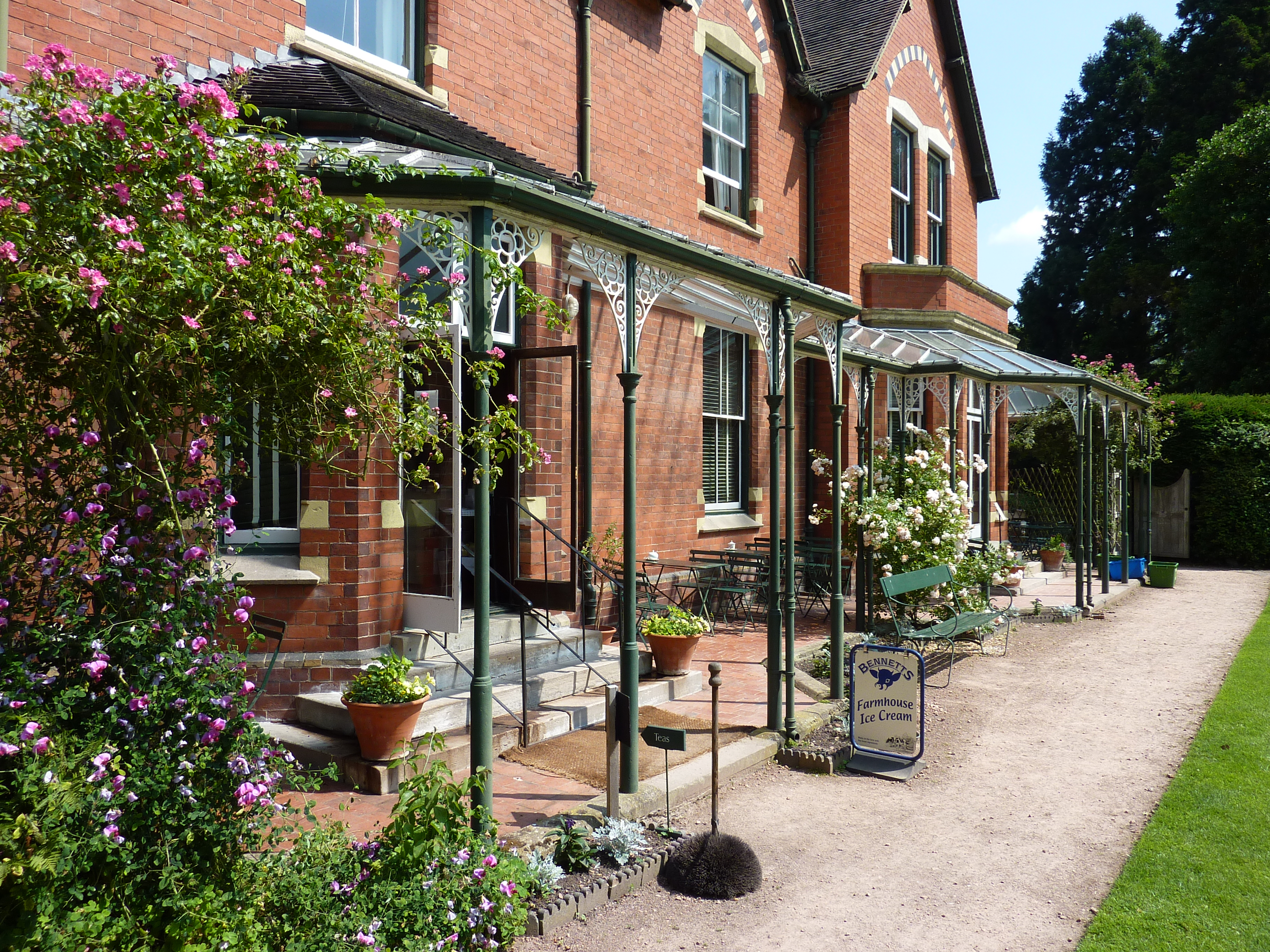
Veranda at the front of Sunnycroft

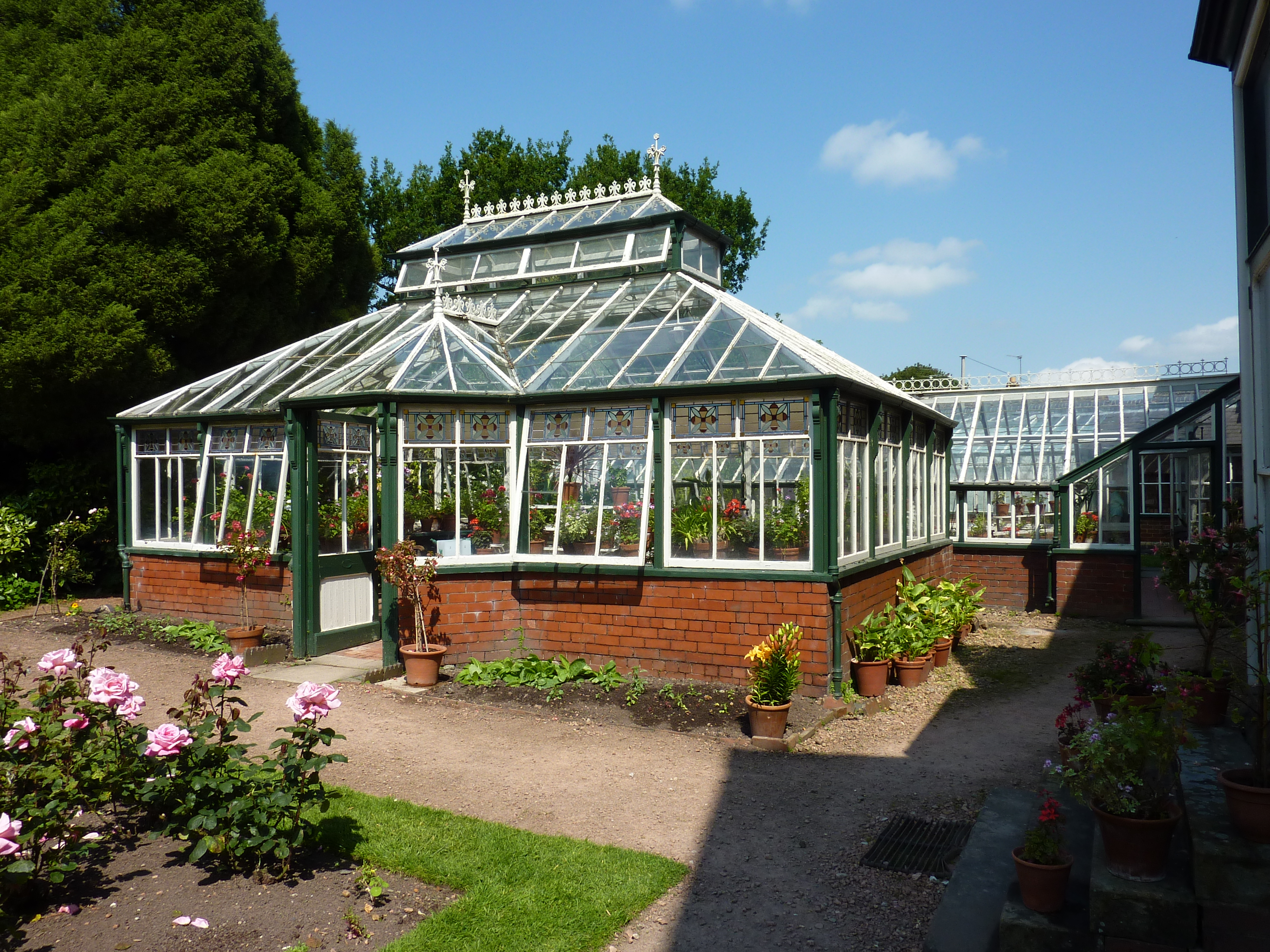
The Grade II listed conservatory at Sunnycroft

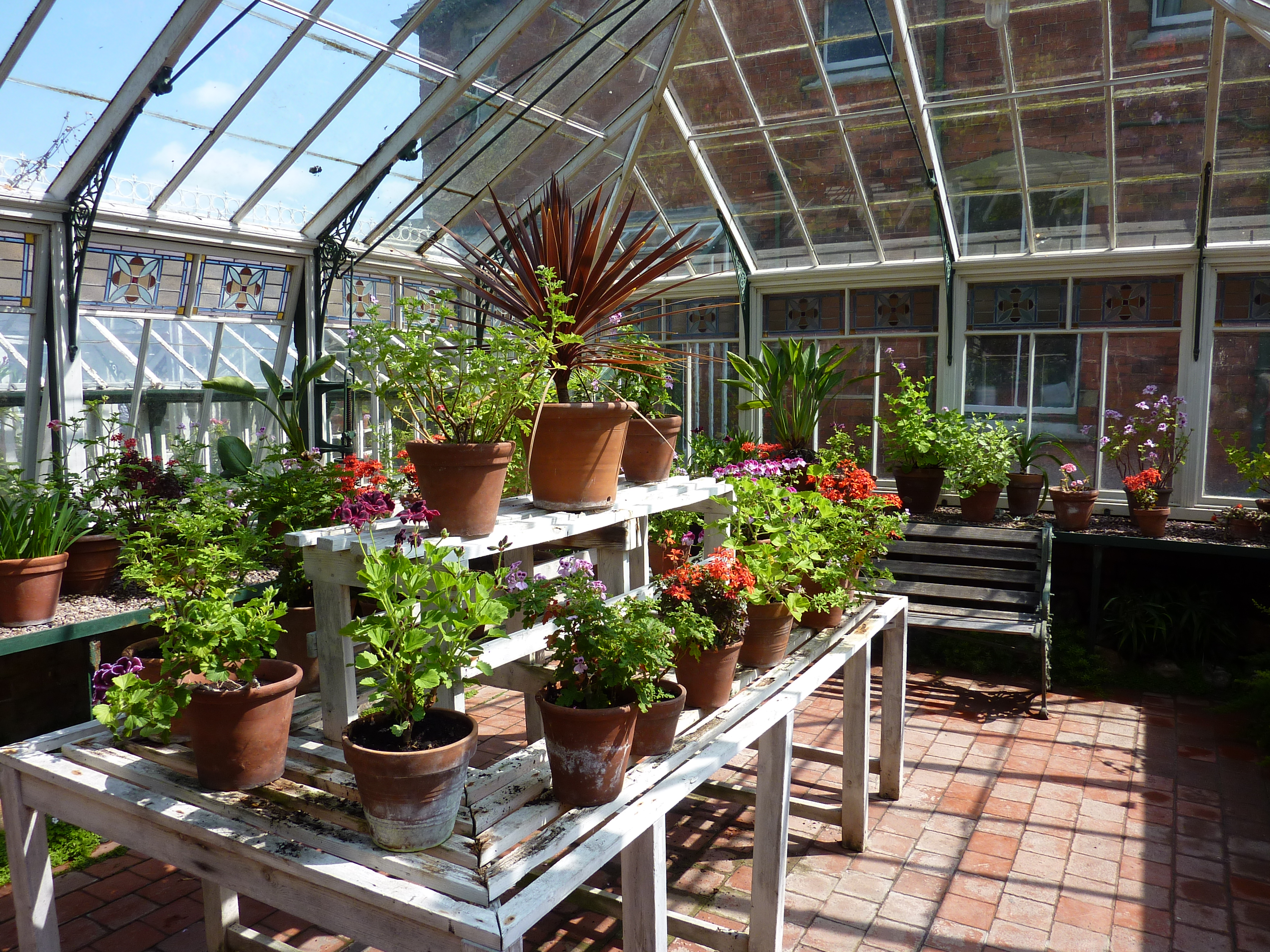
Conservatory Interior

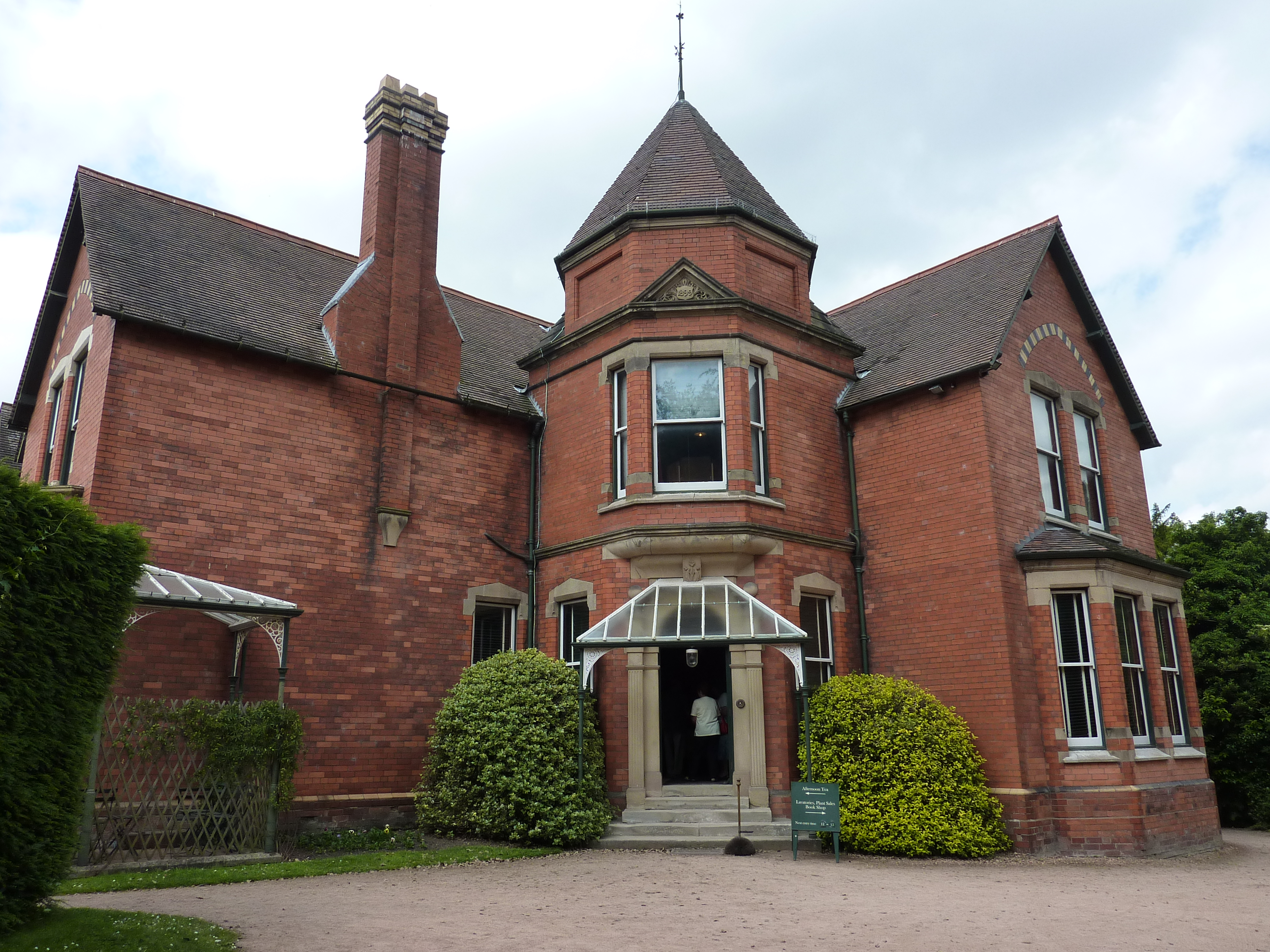
The visitor entrance to Sunnycroft

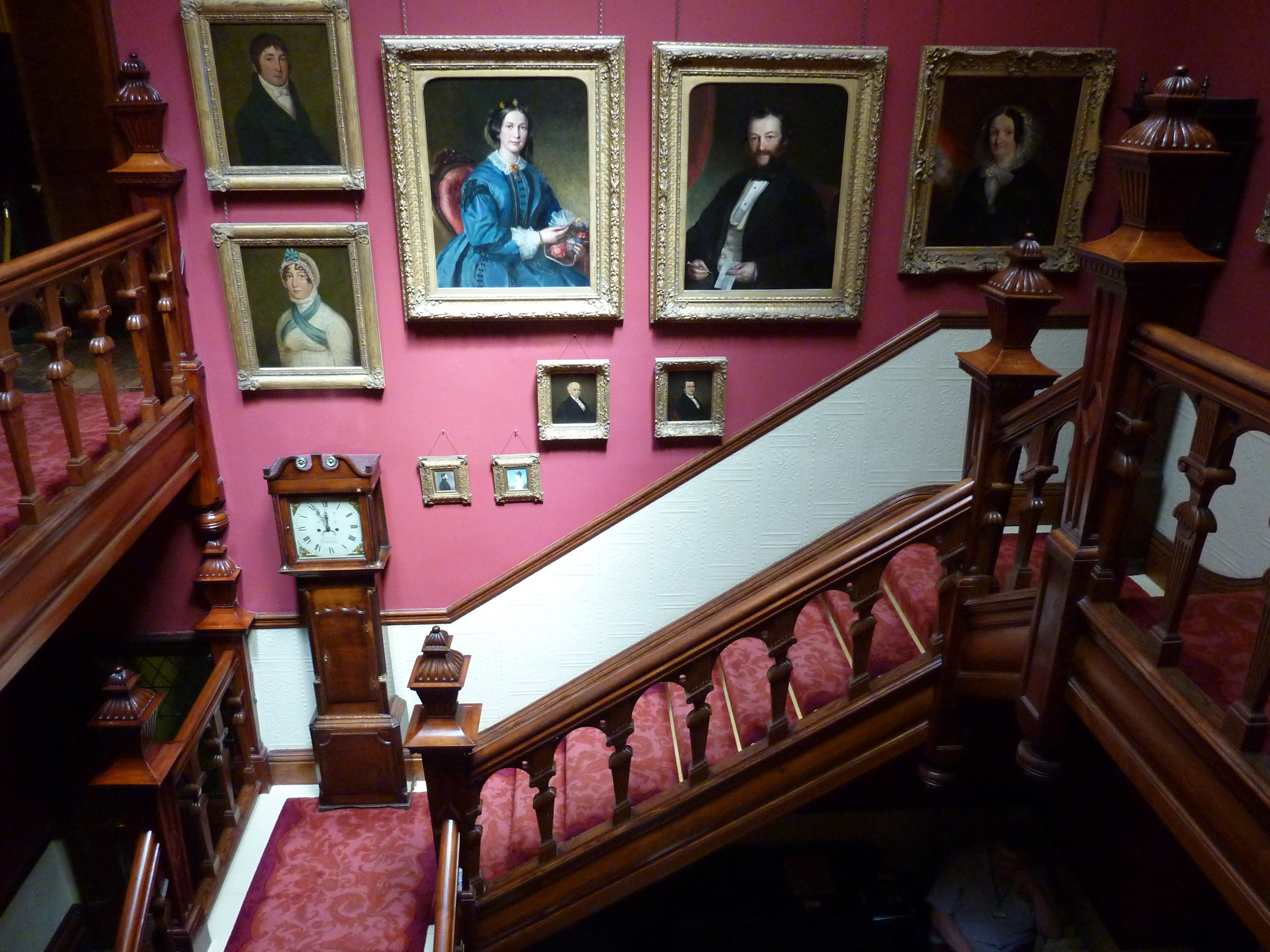
Main staircase

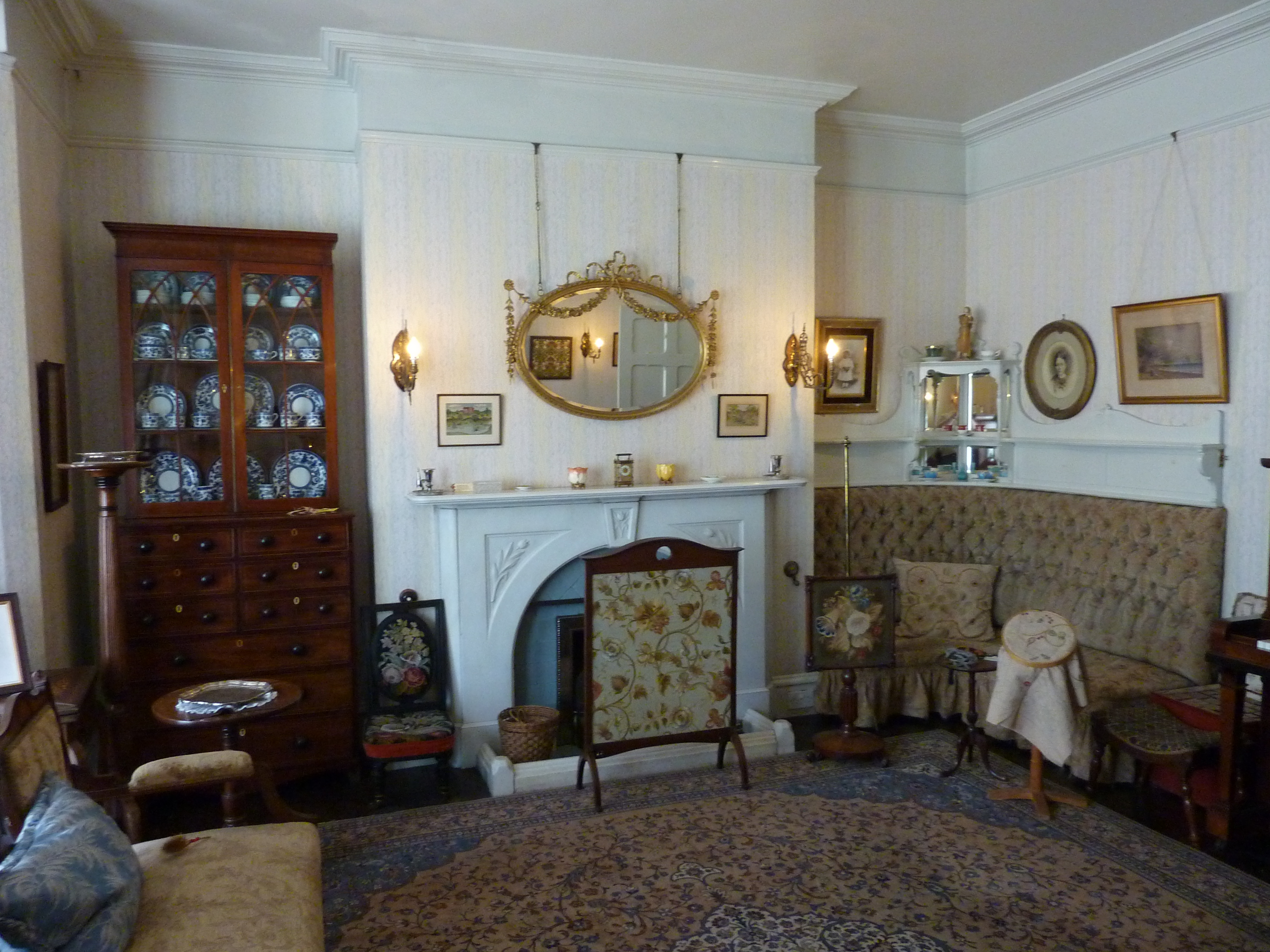
Drawing Room

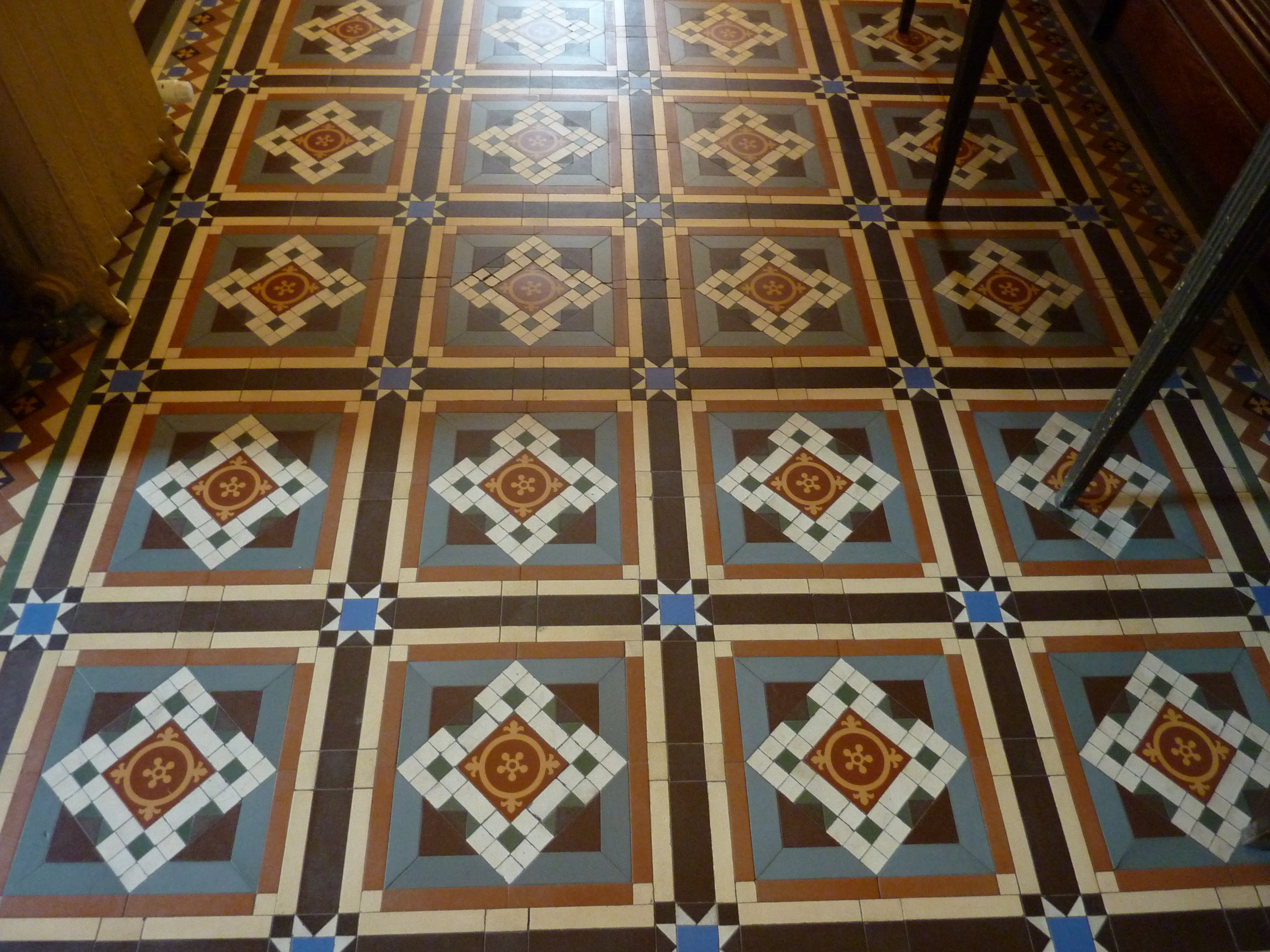
Mosaic tiled floor to entrance hallway

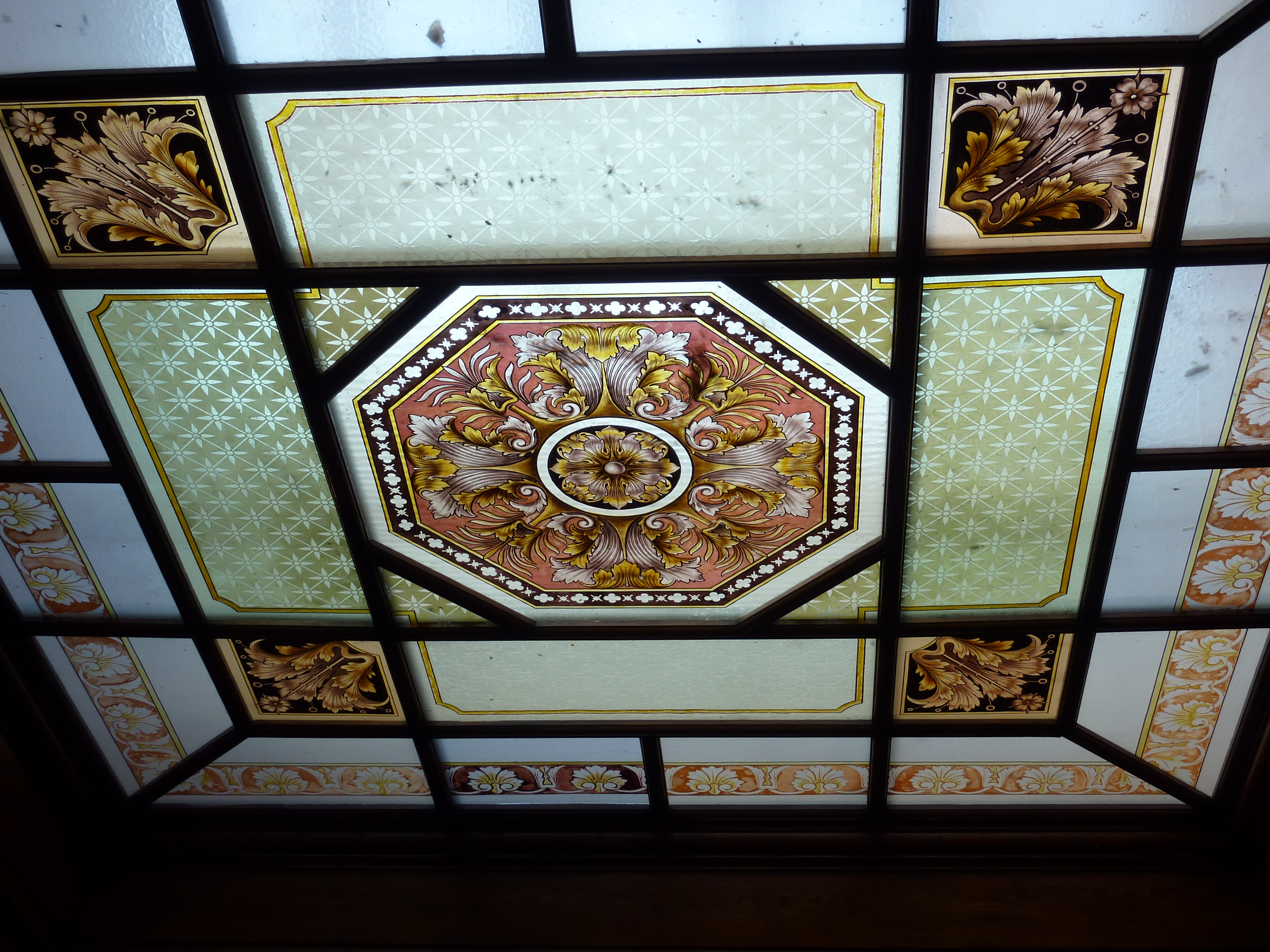
Stained glass ceiling light over main staircase

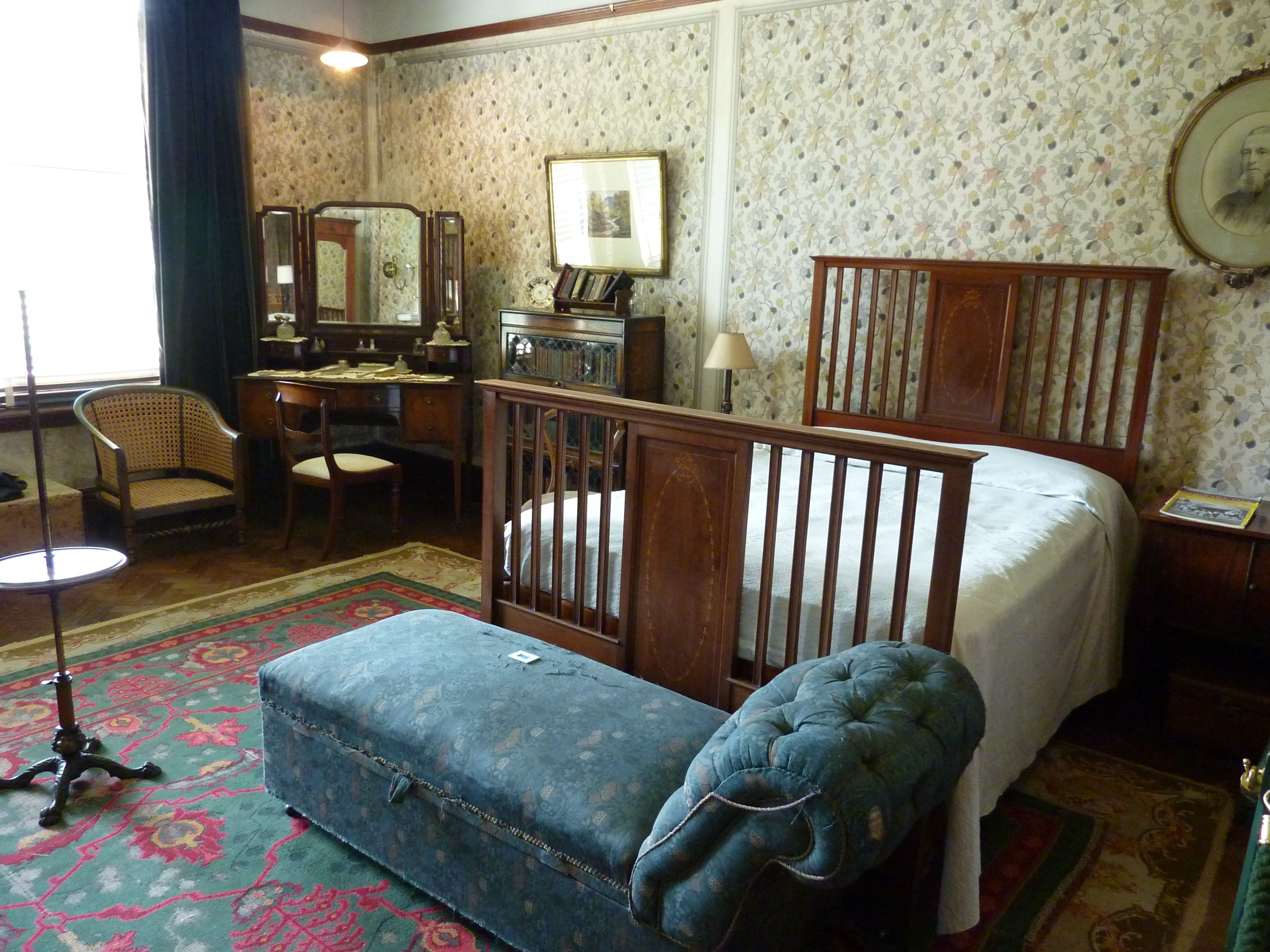
Master bedroom

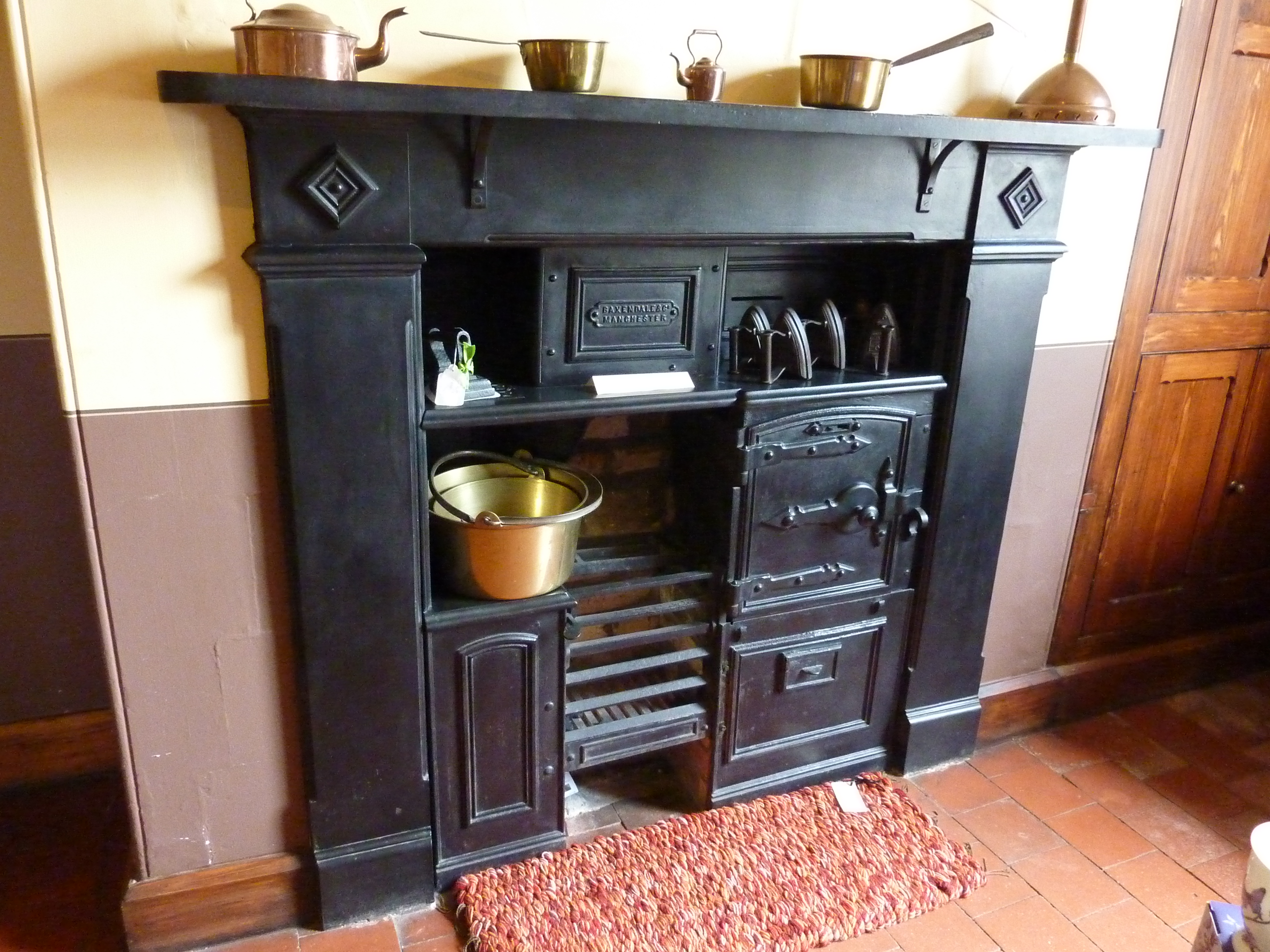
Cooking range in the kitchen

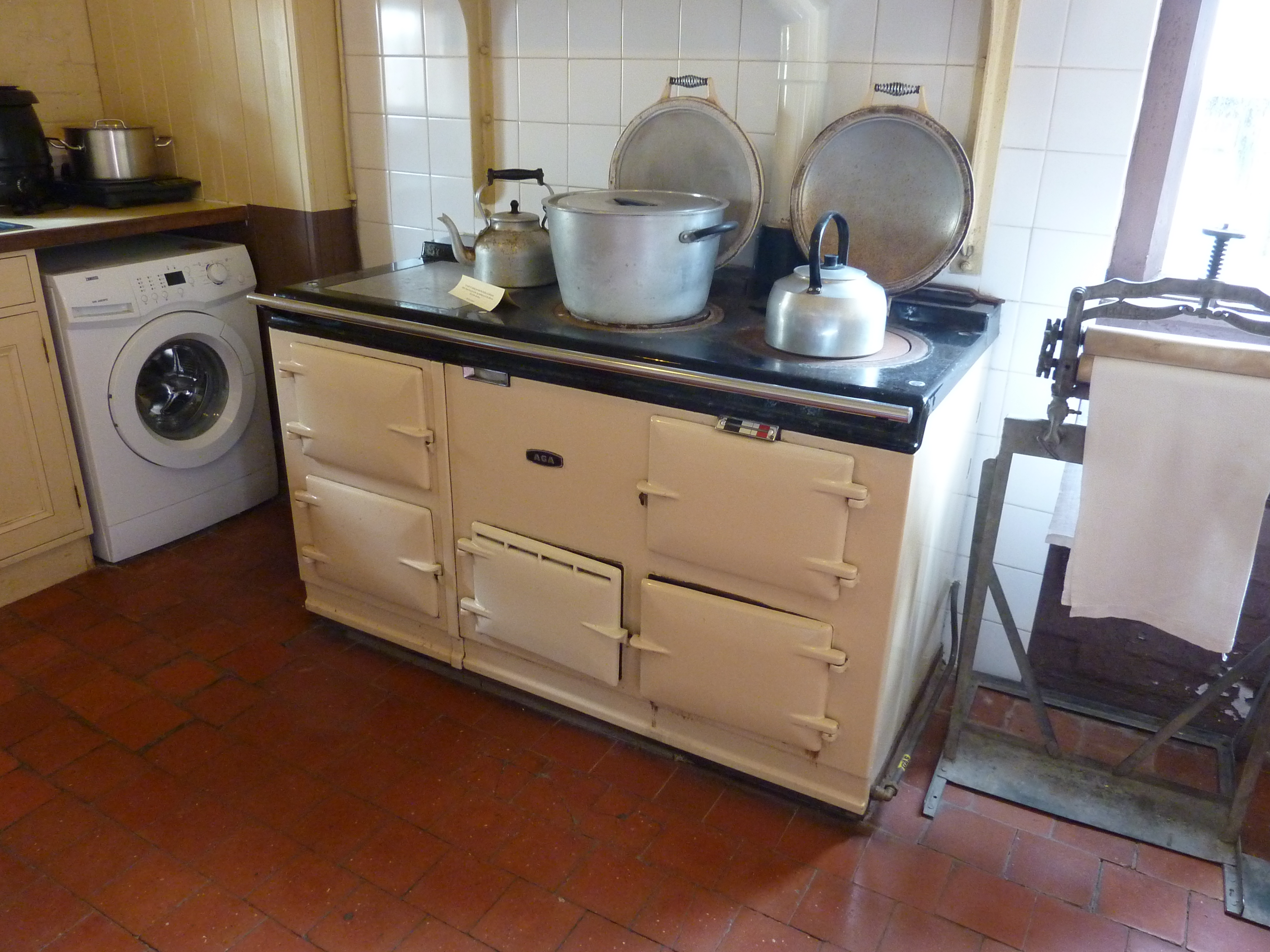
The Aga cooker was manufactured by a company owned by a previous owner of the villa, Offley Lander

== See also ==
- Listed buildings in Wellington, Shropshire
