= Andrew Plimer =

English painter

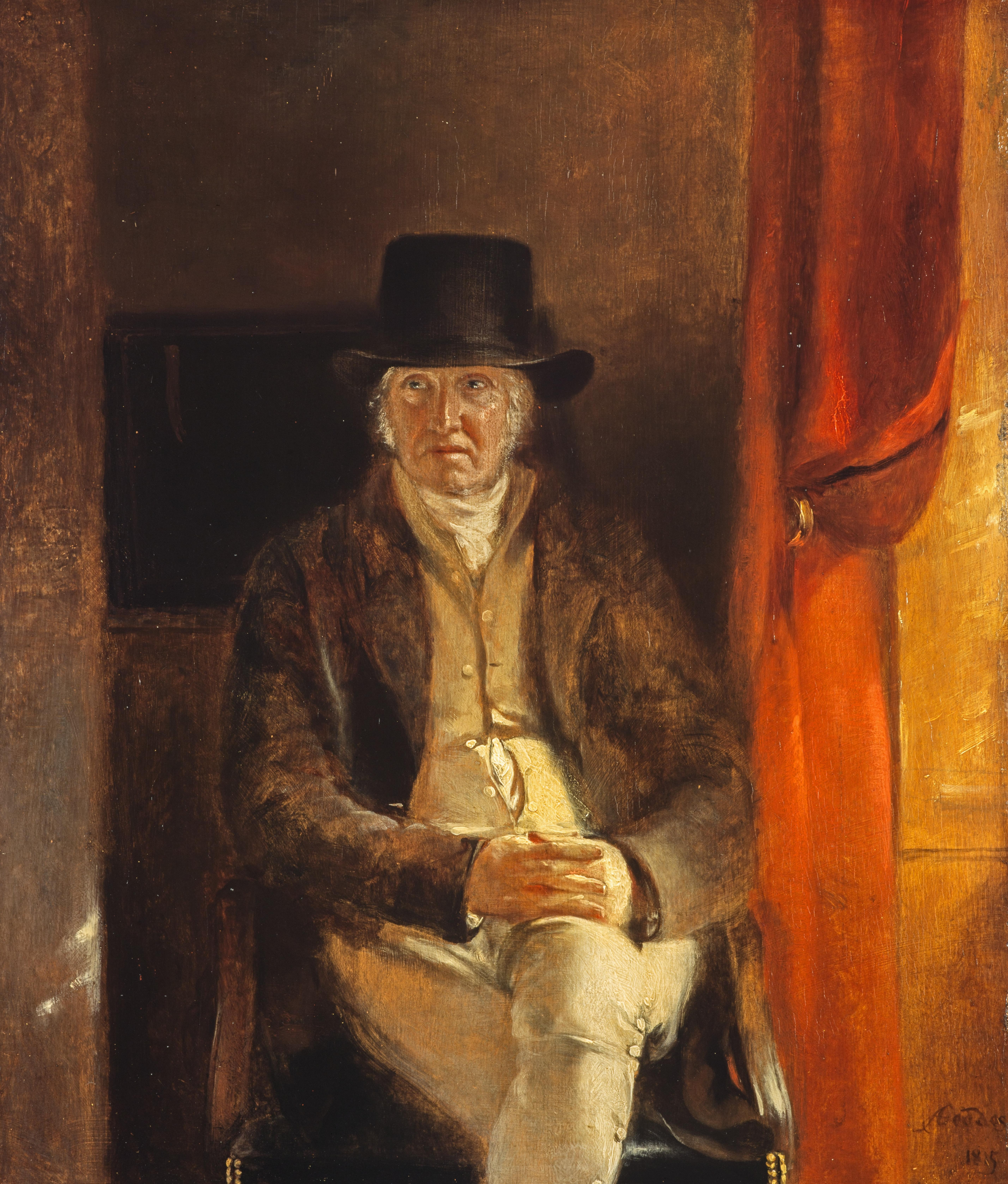
Portrait by Andrew Geddes, 1815

Andrew Plimer (baptized 29 December 1763 – 29 January 1837) was a British artist, whose brother was Nathaniel Plimer, also a painter of miniatures.

Although originally stated in the Dictionary of National Biography to have been born in Bridgwater, Somerset, he has been more recently established to have been born in Wellington, Shropshire, where he was baptised on 29 December 1763, younger son of Nathaniel Plimer (born 1726), a clockmaker, and his wife, variously named as Mary Elizabeth or Eliza.

He and older brother Nathaniel trained as clockmakers but both ran away from home and travelled for over two years in Wales and the west of England with a troupe of Gypsies. About 1781 they settled in London where Andrew took up work as a manservant to Richard Cosway, who later trained him in portrait painting.

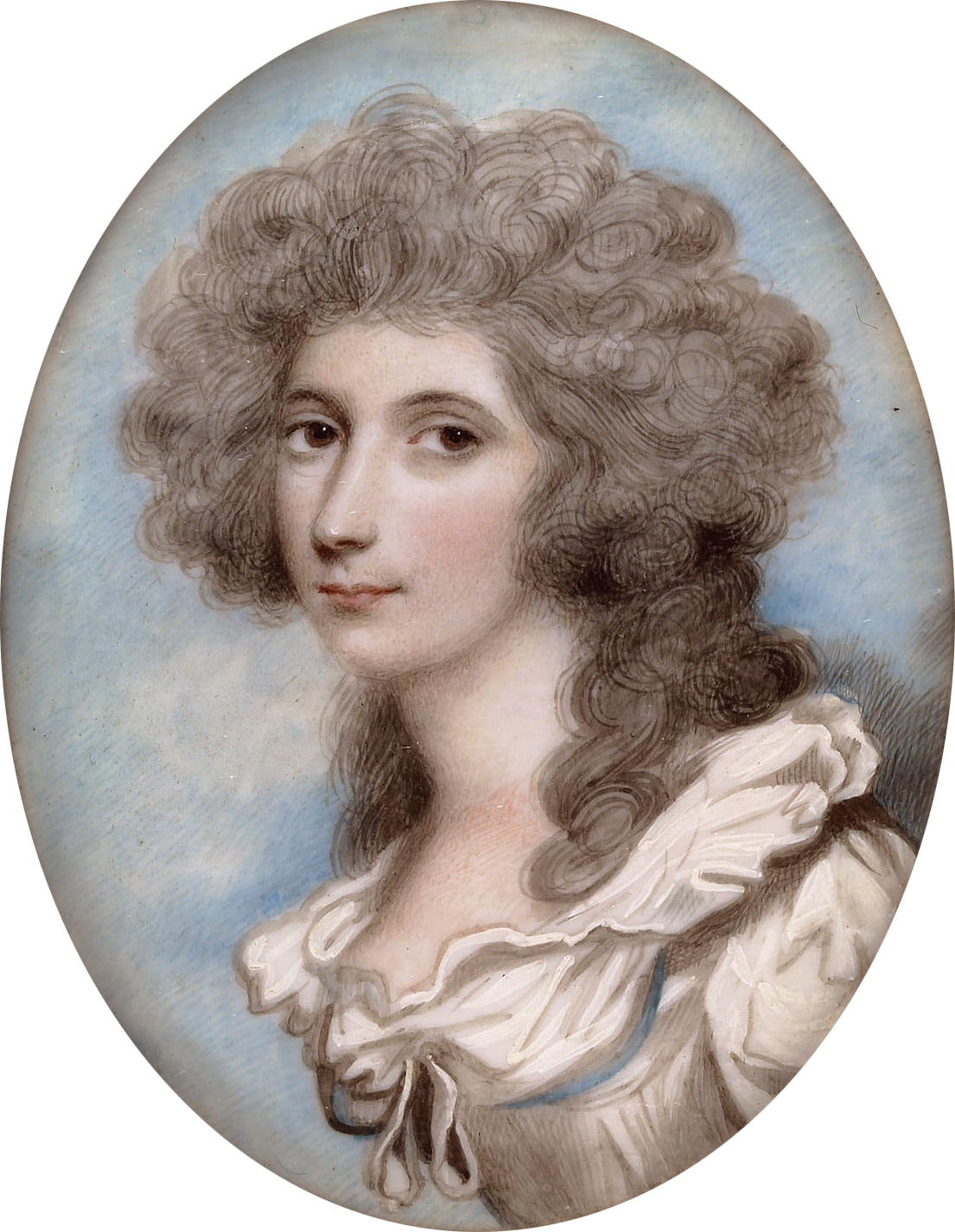
Caroline Price (1755–1826) by Andrew Plimer

Plimer specialised in portrait miniatures. His work was exhibited at the Royal Academy from 1768 to 1810 and in 1819. His most famous painting is of the three daughters of Sir John Rushout. His brother Nathaniel Plimer also became a pupil of Cosway and a painter of miniatures.

Plimer married on 21 February 1801, Joanna Louisa, daughter of John and Frances Knight of Wicken, Northamptonshire. The couple had one son who died in infancy and four daughters. He died in Western Cottages, Western Road, Brighton, Sussex, in January 1837 aged 73 and was buried on 4 February at Old Hove.

His wife's younger sister Mary Ann Knight, another miniaturist, was a pupil and friend of Plimer.
