= John Parton =

English cricketer

John Wesley Parton (31 January 1863 – 30 January 1906) was an English first-class cricketer, who played one match for Yorkshire County Cricket Club in 1889, against Nottinghamshire at Bramall Lane, Sheffield. He had the economical bowling figures of 10 overs, 7 maidens, 1 wicket for 4 runs in Nottinghamshire's first innings of 225, and was caught Barnes bowled Attewell for 2 in Yorkshire's first innings of 201. He did not bowl in Notts second innings of 134, and scored 14 before he was stumped by Sherwin from the bowling of Flowers. Yorkshire were bowled out for 122 in 90 overs, despite Ted Wainwright's 60, and Nottinghamshire won by 36 runs.

In 1889, he was engaged by Worksop C.C. and after playing for Yorkshire, he was professional for Werneth C.C. in Lancashire for many years.

He also played, while County Club professional and player instructor at Wellington Old Hall School, for Shropshire in 1892 and 1893, playing in 15 matches, making a total 679 runs, achieving two centuries and taking 27 wickets.

Born in Wellington, Shropshire, England, Parton died on the day before his 43rd birthday in January 1906 in Rotherham, Yorkshire.
