= Hugh Owen (topographer) =

English churchman and topographer

Hugh Owen (1761–23 December 1827) was an English churchman and topographer, Archdeacon of Salop from 1821.

== Life ==
Owen was the only son of Pryce Owen, M.D., a physician of Shrewsbury, by his wife Bridget, only daughter of John Whitfield. He was educated at Shrewsbury School, then at St John's College, Cambridge, where he graduated B.A. in 1783, and M.A. in 1807.

Owen took holy orders in the Church of England, being ordained deacon in 1784 and priest in 1785 by the Bishop of Lichfield. In 1791 Owen was presented by Charles Bennet, 4th Earl of Tankerville to the vicarage of St. Julian, Shrewsbury; and from 1791 to 1800 was perpetual curate at Berwick near the town. In 1803 he was collated by Bishop John Douglas to the prebend of Gillingham Minor in Salisbury Cathedral; in 1819 he was presented by the dean and chapter of Exeter Cathedral to a portion of the vicarage of Bampton, Oxfordshire, and was also Rector of Stapleton, Shropshire from 1819. Between 1798 and 1815 he was chaplain of the Shrewsbury Yeomanry Cavalry. He was a fellow of the Society of Antiquaries of London, and filled the office of Mayor of Shrewsbury in 1819.

Owen was collated by Bishop James Cornwallis on 27 December 1821 to the archdeaconry of Salop, and on 30 March 1822 to the prebend of Bishopshill in Lichfield Cathedral. On the death of his friend John Brickdale Blakeway in 1826, he succeeded him as minister of the royal peculiar of St Mary's Church, Shrewsbury, and he then resigned the church of St. Julian, though he continued to be portionist of the vicarage of Bampton. He died at Shrewsbury on 23 December 1827. His only son was Edward Pryce Owen.

== Works ==
Owen's major literary work, with John Brickdale Blakeway, was A History of Shrewsbury (2 vols., London, 1825). He had already published, anonymously, Some Account of the ancient and present State of Shrewsbury (Shrewsbury, 1808 and 1810). To John Britton's Architectural Antiquities (vol. iv.) he contributed, with Blakeway, descriptions of Wenlock Abbey, Ludlow Castle and Stokesay Castle.

== Notes ==
Attribution

This article incorporates text from a publication now in the public domain: Lee, Sidney, ed. (1895). "Owen, Hugh (1761-1827)". Dictionary of National Biography. Vol. 42. London: Smith, Elder & Co.
