= Charles Pritchard (cricketer) =

English cricketer

Personal information
- Full name: Charles Scudamore Pritchard
- Born: 7 March 1962 (age 64); Wellington, Shropshire, England
- Batting: Right-handed
- Role: Wicket-keeper

Domestic team information
- Years: Team
- 1986–1996: Devon

Career statistics
Competition	List A
Matches	4
Runs scored	1
Batting average	1.00
100s/50s	–/–
Top score	1*
Balls bowled	–
Wickets	–
Bowling average	–
5 wickets in innings	–
10 wickets in match	–
Best bowling	–
Catches/stumpings	2/–
- Source: Cricinfo, 7 February 2011

Charles 'Charlie' Scudamore Pritchard (born 7 March 1962) is a former English cricketer. Pritchard was a right-handed batsman who fielded primarily as a wicket-keeper. He was born in Wellington, Shropshire.

Pritchard made his debut for Devon in 1986 against the Somerset Second XI in the Minor Counties Championship. From 1986 to 1996, he represented Devon in 47 Championship matches, the last of which came against Cheshire. The season following his debut, he made his debut in the MCCA Knockout Trophy for the county against Dorset. From 1987 to 1994, he represented the county in 14 Trophy matches, the last of which came against Bedfordshire. Pritchard made his List A debut for Devon against Essex in the 1st round of the 1991 NatWest Trophy. From 1991 to 1994 he played 4 List A matches, the last of which came against Yorkshire in the 1st round of the 1994 NatWest Trophy. In his 4 List A matches, he scored a single run from two innings, giving him a batting average of 1.00. In the field he took 2 catches.
