= Tommy Pritchard =

English footballer

Personal information
- Full name: Thomas Francis Pritchard
- Date of birth: 18 June 1904
- Place of birth: Wellington, Shropshire, England
- Date of death: 1968 (aged 63–64)
- Position: Central defender

Senior career*
Years	Team	Apps	(Gls)
1923	GWR (Wolverhampton)		
1924	Wolverhampton Wanderers	0	(0)
1924	Sunbeam Motors		
1925–1926	Stockport County	2	(0)
1926–1928	Newport County	23	(1)
1928–1929	Wolverhampton Wanderers	56	(3)
1929–1931	Charlton Athletic	43	(0)
1931–1932	Thames	27	(1)
1932–1933	Olympique Marseille		
1933–1934	Preston North End	1	(0)
1934–1935	Lancaster Town		
1935–1936	Mansfield Town	1	(0)
1936	Lancaster Town		
Total		153	(5)
- * Club domestic league appearances and goals

Thomas Francis Pritchard (18 June 1904 – 1968) was an English professional footballer who played in the Football League for Charlton Athletic, and Mansfield Town, Newport County, Preston North End, Stockport County, Thames and Wolverhampton Wanderers.
