= Listed buildings in Wellington, Shropshire =

Wellington is a civil parish in the district of Telford and Wrekin, Shropshire, England. It contains 44 listed buildings that are recorded in the National Heritage List for England. Of these, two are at Grade II*, the middle of the three grades, and the others are at Grade II, the lowest grade. The parish consists of the town of Wellington, a market town since 1244, and incorporated into Telford new town in 1968. Most of the listed buildings are houses, shops and associated structures, the earliest of them timber framed. The other listed buildings include public houses and hotels, churches and associated structures, and two mileposts.

== Key ==
Grade	Criteria
II*	Particularly important buildings of more than special interest
II	Buildings of national importance and special interest

== Buildings ==
Name and location	Photograph	Date	Notes	Grade
The Old Hall; 52.69550°N 2.50972°W		c. 16th century	A house, later extended and used as a school, the original part is timber framed with a tile roof, two storeys and two bays. In the 18th century a rendered gabled cross-wing was added at the left, and in the 1990's the building was extended to the right with a range of one storey and an attic and three bays. Some windows are mullioned and transomed, most are casements, in the right return is a Gothic window, and in the 19th-century extension are two dormers with half-hipped gables.	II
White Lion Public House; 52.70057°N 2.51844°W		c. 1600	The public house was extended in the 18th century, it has two storeys and attics, and tile roofs. The original part has timber framed upper parts and a stuccoed brick ground floor. The upper storey and gable are jettied, the gable is elaborately decorated and has a carved bressumer on corbels carved with heads. The left range has two bays. The central doorway has pilasters, on the left is a splayed bay window, and on the right is a bow window with pilasters and an entablature with a dentilled cornice. In the upper floor are sash windows, the left window tripartite, and there are two gabled dormers.	II
1 Market Square; 52.70082°N 2.51850°W		Late 16th to early 17th century	A timber framed shop with plastered panels, the right return is in painted brick, and the roof is tiled. There are two storeys and three bays. In the ground floor is a 19th-century shop front with end pilasters and an embattled fascia, and in the upper floor are sash windows. On the front are two jettied gables with openwork bargeboards, finials and pendants, and the left return has a jettied gable on curved brackets.	II
11 and 13 New Street; 52.70079°N 2.51786°W	—	17th century	A pair of shops in plastered timber framing, with oversailing eaves, a modillion soffit, and a tile roof. There are two storeys and an attic, and two bays. The ground floor contains two modern shop fronts, in the upper floor are sash windows, and there is a gabled dormer. At the rear are two timber framed rendered gables.	II
25–31 Park Street; 52.70482°N 2.51786°W		17th century	A row of timber framed buildings refaced in brick and painted at the front, with exposed timber framing and brick infill at the rear, and a tile roof. There are two storeys and five bays. The doorways, a cart entry, and the windows, which are casements, have segmental heads.	II
12 Toll Road and Oak Beams; 52.69217°N 2.49823°W	—	17th century	The older part is No. 12 Toll Road, which is roughcast and forms a cross-wing to Oak Beams, which dates from the 18th century and is rendered over brick. Both parts have tile roofs with gabled ends, and each has one storey and an attic. No. 12 Toll Road has a parapeted gable and casement windows. Oak Beam has three bays, mullioned and transomed casement windows and gabled dormers.	II
Arleston Manor House; 52.69009°N 2.49587°W	—	17th century	The former manor house is timber framed with a tile roof, and has two storeys and an attic. The southeast front has two gabled bays, and the ends of two gabled parallel ranges. The upper storey and gables are jettied on moulded bressumers, and on the front are moulded oriel windows. The southwest front has three bays, and in this front and at the rear the upper storeys is jettied.	II*
Barn southwest of Old Hall; 52.69467°N 2.51000°W	—	c. 17th century	The barn is timber framed with brick infill and a tile roof with gabled ends. It has been partly refaced and extended to the south in brick.	II
Park Hotel; 52.70559°N 2.51745°W		c. 17th century	The hotel is roughcast, probably with a timber framed core, and has a tile roof. The original part has one storey and an attic, there is a two-storey extension to the left, and a later single-storey wing on the right. In the centre is a canted bay window, to the right is a casement window, to the left is a gabled porch with pierced bargeboards, and above is a gabled dormer with shaped brackets.	II
The Old Pumphouse; 52.69171°N 2.49772°W	—	c. 17th century	A timber framed house partly encased in brick and painted, with a tile roof. There are two storeys and an attic, and the house consists of a two-bay cross-wing with string courses and casement windows, and a rear wing.	II
20 and 22 Church Street; 52.70277°N 2.51821°W	—	18th century	A pair of stuccoed brick houses with rusticated quoins, a moulded eaves soffit, and a tile roof. There are two storeys with attics, and four bays. The doorways have hoods on console brackets and No. 22 has a shop front. The windows are sashes, and there are three gabled dormers.	II
8, 10 and 12 New Street; 52.70067°N 2.51776°W	—	18th century	A row of three shops incorporating earlier material. They are in painted brick, and have tile roofs with a parapeted gable at one end, and hipped at the other. There are three storeys and three bays. In the ground floor are modern shop fronts, the upper floors contain a mix of sash and casement windows, and inside No, 12 is earlier timber framing.	II
11 and 13 Park Street; 52.70444°N 2.51812°W	—	18th century	A pair of painted brick houses, later a hotel, with stone rusticated quoins, and a tile roof with brick parapet gable ends. There are two storeys and attics, and six bays. In the ground floor are two bay windows, the doorways have hoods, the windows are sashes with segmental heads, and there are six gabled dormers.	II
Cock Hotel; 52.69606°N 2.50629°W		18th century	The hotel is in painted brick with a modillion eaves cornice and a tile roof. There are two storeys and an attic, and six bays. The porch has thin columns and a heavy entablature, and above it is a wrought iron arched lamp bracket. The windows in the ground floor are modern casements, the upper floor contains sash windows, and there are three gabled dormers.	II
Dothill House; 52.70920°N 2.52039°W	—	18th century	A red brick house with a moulded eaves cornice and a tile roof with parapet gable ends. There are three storeys, three bays, a two-storey left wing, and a later right extension. The central doorway has a moulded architrave. The windows are sashes, in the lower two floors with segmental arches and triple keyblocks.	II
Dun Cow Public House; 52.70076°N 2.51869°W	—	18th century	The public house is in stuccoed brick with a parapet, and a tile roof with parapet gable ends. There are three storeys, three bays, and a gabled rear wing. On the front are two two-storey splayed bay windows, the right converted into a porch. Most of the windows are sashes, and there are two casement windows.	II
Parville House; 52.70363°N 2.52022°W	—	18th century	A red brick house with moulded modillion eaves and a cornice, and a tile roof with parapet gable ends. There are three storeys and four bays. The porch is in stone and has Tuscan columns and an entablature, and the windows are sashes with plain stone lintels.	II
Portway House; 52.70325°N 2.51772°W	—	18th century	A red brick house with a moulded cornice, and a tile roof with coped gable ends. There are three storeys, originally it had four bays, with a bay added to the left in the late 19th century. The doorway has panelled pilasters, a rectangular fanlight with geometric tracery, and a hood on curved brackets. The windows are sashes, those in the ground floor and in the original part of the middle floor with segmental arched heads.	II
Tyrone House; 52.70294°N 2.51847°W	—	18th century	A house, later shops, it is stuccoed with three giant pilasters, an entablature and a blocking course. There are three storeys and seven bays. In the ground floor are modern shop fronts, and the upper floors contain sash windows in architraves.	II
2 and 3 Market Square; 52.70092°N 2.51869°W	—	Late 18th century	A pair of red brick shops with a moulded eaves cornice, and a tile roof with parapet gable ends. There are three storeys and three bays. In the ground floor are two shop fronts, one modern and the other older. The upper floors contain a mix of sash and casement windows with plain stone lintels.	II
26 Vineyard Road; 52.70332°N 2.52084°W	—	Late 18th century	A red brick house with a tile roof and parapet gable ends. There are two storeys and three bays. The central doorway has pilasters and an entablature, and the windows are sashes with moulded surrounds and segmental heads.	II
Falcon Hotel; 52.69306°N 2.53445°W	—	Late 18th century	A farmhouse, later a hotel, it is in red brick with a moulded eaves cornice and a hipped tile roof. There are three storeys, four bays, and a recessed two-storey two-bay wing to the right. The central doorway has a stuccoed Roman Doric porch and to the right is a splayed bay window. The other windows are sashes with keyblocks. At the rear is a shaped gable and a stair window with a pointed head.	II
Raven Inn; 52.70016°N 2.51844°W		Late 18th century	The public house is in painted brick with a moulded eaves cornice, and a tile roof with gable ends. There are two storeys and an attic, and two bays. The central doorway has a moulded surround and a pedimented hood on shaped brackets. The windows are Venetian windows, the middle light in the upper floor with ogee heads, and there are two gabled dormers.	II
Property owned by the Severn Trent Water Authority; 52.70351°N 2.52057°W	—	Late 18th century	A red brick house with a moulded cornice, and a tile roof with parapet gable ends. There are three storeys and three bays. In the centre is a porch with Tuscan columns and a heavy entablature, which is flanked by bay windows. The windows in the upper floors are sashes, in the middle floor they have voussoired lintels with keyblocks, and in the top floor the lintels are plain.	II
All Saints Church; 52.70203°N 2.51775°W		1788–90	The church was designed by George Steuart in Neoclassical style. It is built in Grinshill sandstone, and consists of a nave with an apse, and a tower behind the west front. The west front has three bays with giant Tuscan pilasters carrying a pediment. In the centre is a doorway flanked by windows, all with square heads, and above are lunettes. The tower has two stages with paired Ionic pilasters, clock faces, and a small dome. Along the sides of the church are two tiers of windows, the upper windows round-headed, and in the apse is a tripartite pilastered window. Inside the church are galleries on three sides.	II*
7 Church Street; 52.70176°N 2.51920°W	—	Late 18th or early 19th century	A red brick house with a stone coped parapet and a slate roof. There are three storeys and three bays. The doorway has a pediment, and the windows are sashes.	II
13 and 14 Market Street; 52.70112°N 2.51850°W	—	Late 18th or early 19th century	A pair of shops in painted brick with a parapet and a tile roof. There are three storeys and two bays. In the ground floor are modern shop fronts, and above are sash windows.	II
5, 7 and 9 New Street; 52.70079°N 2.51805°W	—	Late 18th or early 19th century	Three shops in red brick with a stone cornice and blocking course and a tile roof, and with an earlier timber framed core, the timber framing exposed in the gable end. There are three storeys and four bays. The ground floor contains modern shop fronts, and in the upper floors are arcades with segmental arches and brick pilasters with stone imposts. The windows are sashes with voussoired lintels.	II
24 New Street; 52.70049°N 2.51705°W	—	Late 18th or early 19th century	A shop in painted brick with a moulded eaves cornice, and a slate roof with parapet gable ends. There are three storeys and three bays. In the ground floor is a central doorway with pilaster shafts and a rectangular fanlight. This is flanked by an early 19th-century shop front with pilasters, and a bowed entablature with a dentilled cornice, and to the right is a round-arched passageway. The upper floors contain sash windows with voussoired lintels and fluted keyblocks.	II
Gate piers, steps, walls and lychgate, All Saints Church; 52.70156°N 2.51883°W		Late 18th or early 19th century	The gate piers flank the southwest entrance to the churchyard. They are in stone, and have a panelled frieze, a moulded cornice, and a hemispherical cap. Steps flanked by coped stone walls lead up to a memorial lychgate that was added in 1922. The lychgate has stone walls, a timber superstructure with round arches, a timber framed gable with a cross finial, and a tiled roof. On the arches are inscriptions, and on the inside walls are bronze plaques with inscriptions and the names of those lost in the two World Wars.	II
Charlton Arms Hotel; 52.70261°N 2.51814°W		Late 18th or early 19th century	The building is in stuccoed brick with tile roofs. The main range has three storeys and three bays. In the left bay is a porch with Tuscan columns and pilasters carrying a heavy entablature, and the windows are sashes. To the left is a two-storey one-bay wing with a hipped roof and tripartite sash windows.	II
Milepost near Football Ground; 52.69653°N 2.49745°W	—	c. 1815–19	The milepost is on the north side of Watling Street, It is in cast iron, it has splayed sides, and indicates the distances to London, to Shifnal, and to ""SALOP" (Shrewsbury).	II
Milepost near Wrekin Hospital; 52.69367°N 2.52251°W		c. 1815–19	The milepost is on the north side of Holyhead Road. It is in cast iron, it has splayed sides, and indicates the distances to London, to Shifnal, and to ""SALOP" (Shrewsbury).	II
6 Market Square; 52.70119°N 2.51881°W	—	Early 19th century	A stuccoed shop with a cornice and a blocking course, and a tile roof with coped gable ends. There are three storeys and two bays. In the ground floor is a shop front with a large fascia, and the upper floors contain sash windows.	II
15 and 15A Market Square; 52.70103°N 2.51844°W	—	Early 19th century	A pair of red brick shops with three storeys, three bays, and a rear wing. The left two bays have pilasters meeting to form a segmental arch, over which is a pediment. In the ground floor are two shop fronts, and the upper floors contain sash windows.	II
30–36 Park Street; 52.70443°N 2.51788°W	—	Early 19th century	A terrace of four red brick houses with a brick eaves course and a tile roof. There are two storeys, and each house has two bays. The doorways have pilasters and cornices, and the windows are sashes with painted stone lintels.	II
38 Whitchurch Road; 52.70770°N 2.51830°W	—	Early 19th century	Originally a lodge to Apley Castle, it is stuccoed and has a hipped slate roof. There is one storey and three bays, the middle bay projecting under a pediment. It contains a Tuscan porch and a doorway with panelled reveals. The windows are sashes.	II
Eastgate House; 52.69708°N 2.50899°W	—	Early 19th century	A red brick house with a slate roof and stone coped gable ends. There are three storeys, three bays, flanking single-storey single-bay wings, and a single-storey extension at the rear. The central doorway has pilasters, a rectangular fanlight, and an entablature. The windows are sashes, in the ground floor they are tripartite, in the lower two floors they have keyblocks, and in the wings they have segmental heads.	II
Prospect House; 52.70665°N 2.51840°W	—	Early 19th century	A red brick house with oversailing eaves and a hipped tile roof. There are three storeys and three bays. In the centre is a gabled porch on slender columns flanked by square bay windows, and the upper floors contain sash windows.	II
The Mount; 52.69882°N 2.52128°W	—	Early 19th century	A red brick house with a moulded eaves cornice and a hipped slate roof. There are three storeys, three bays, a large right wing, and a smaller left wing. The middle bay projects under a pediment, and it contains a round-arched doorway with a moulded architrave, panelled reveals, and a traceried fanlight. The doorway is flanked by columns carrying an entablature that is carried over the outer bays. The windows are sashes, in the top floor with embattled lintels.	II
Christ Church; 52.69731°N 2.51107°W		1838	The church is in buff brick with some stone dressings and slate roofs, and is in Gothic style. It consists of a nave, a short chancel, and a west tower. The tower has octagonal turrets rising to pinnacles, a clock face on the west front, and an embattled parapet. Along the sides of the nave are lancet windows between buttresses, the east window is a triple lancet, and the chancel has octagonal turrets with pinnacles.	II
16 and 17 Market Square; 52.70093°N 2.51838°W	—	c. 1840	A pair of red brick shops with stuccoed dressings, three storeys and four bays. In the ground floor are modern shop fronts. The upper floors contain paired pilasters carrying an entablature with a heavy cornice and a blocking course. The windows are sashes with panelled lintels and moulded hoods on console brackets.	II
Sunnycroft; 52.69544°N 2.51672°W		1880	A house that was expanded in 1899, it is in red brick with dressings in polychromic brick and stone and a slate roof. There are two storeys, the garden front has three gabled bays, the right bay larger and projecting. The entrance front has a projecting wing on the front and a polygonal porch in the angle, over which is an oriel window and an octagonal turret with a weathervane. On the garden front is a cast iron verandah, and the windows are sashes. At the north is a single-storey kitchen range, a vine house, and kennels. The interior has been little changed.	II
Conservatory, Sunnycroft; 52.69544°N 2.51699°W		c. 1900	The conservatory is in painted wood and glass on a low red brick wall, with decoration in stained glass and wrought iron. It has a rectangular plan, a hipped roof with a lantern in the centre, and a canted bay containing a doorway. On the bay and lantern is decorative iron cresting.	II
