= John Brickdale Blakeway =

English barrister, cleric and topographer

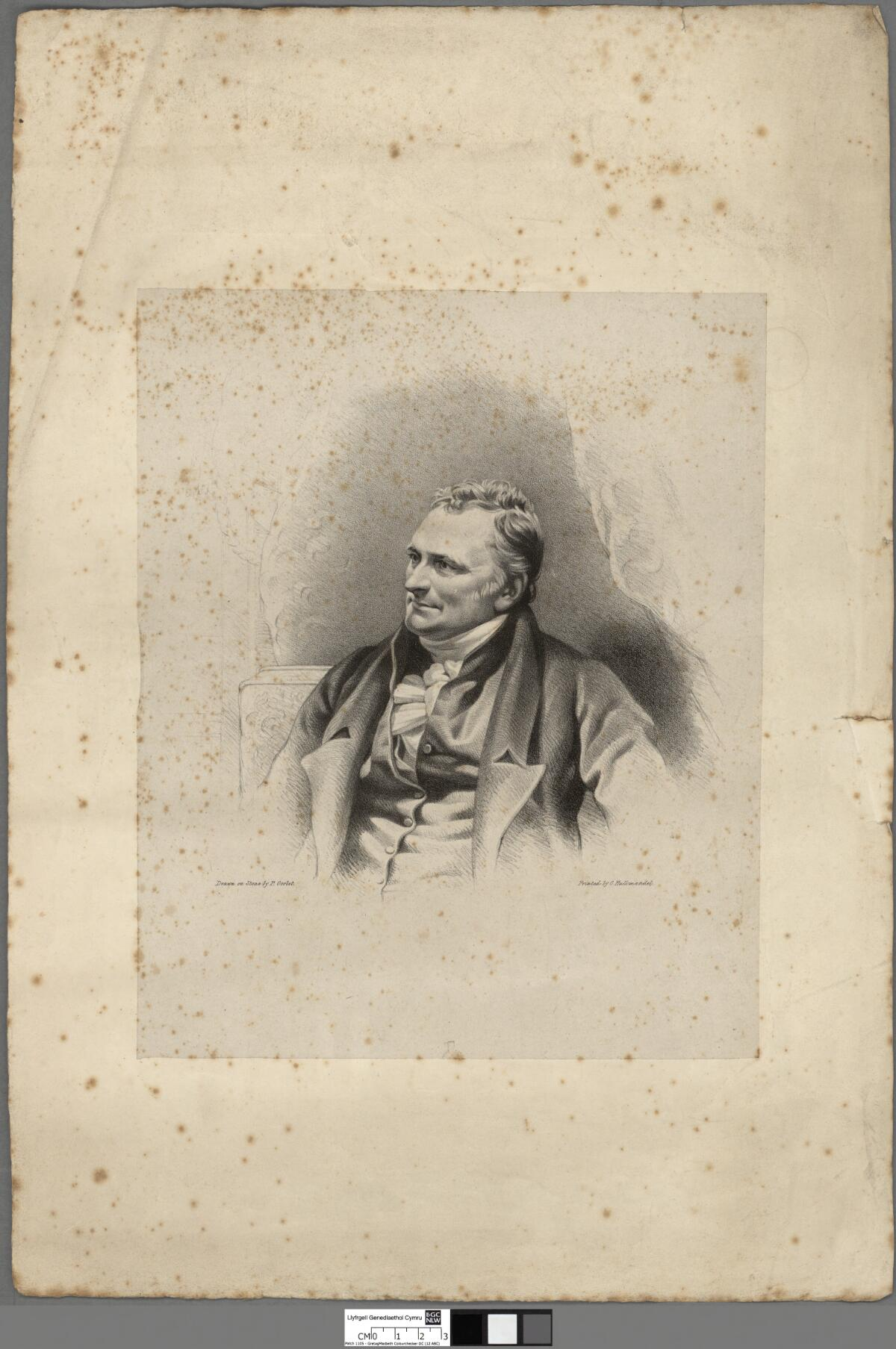
Portrait of Rev. John Brickdale Blakeway

John Brickdale Blakeway (24 June 1765 – 10 March 1826) was an English barrister, cleric and topographer.

== Life ==
The eldest son of Joshua Blakeway, of Shrewsbury, by Elizabeth, sister of Matthew Brickdale, Member of Parliament for Bristol, he was born at Shrewsbury on 24 June 1765, and educated at Shrewsbury Free School. In 1775 he was moved to Westminster School, where he remained till 1782. He went on to Oriel College, Oxford (B.A. 1786, M.A. 1795).

On leaving university Blakeway entered Lincoln's Inn, and was called to the bar in 1789. When his prospects of family money changed, he decided to enter the Church of England, and was ordained in 1793.

In 1794 Blakeway was presented by his uncle, the Rev. Edward Blakeway, to the ministry of the Royal Peculiar of St Mary's Church, Shrewsbury. On his uncle's death he became official of the peculiar, and also succeeded him in the vicarage of Neen Savage in Shropshire, and in the rectory of Felton, Somerset. In 1800 he was presented to the vicarage of Kinlet, Shropshire.

Blakeway was elected a fellow of the Society of Antiquaries of London in 1807. From 1800 till 1816 he divided his time between Kinlet and Shrewsbury, but, finding it inconvenient to keep up two houses, he gave up Felton and Kinlet in that year, and thenceforward resided exclusively in his native town. He died at the Council House, Shrewsbury, on 10 March 1826 aged 60, and was buried in St. Mary's Church, where a monument, executed by John Carline, was erected to his memory.

== Works ==
Blakeway's works were:

- An Attempt to ascertain the Author of the Letters published under the signature of Junius, Shrewsbury, 1813. Blakeway argued that the identity of Junius was John Horne Tooke.
- The Sequel of an Attempt to ascertain the Author of the Letters published under the signature of Junius, London, 1815.
- A History of Shrewsbury, 2 vols., London, 1825, with Hugh Owen.
- The Sheriffs of Shropshire, with their armorial bearings, and notices, biographical and genealogical, of their families, Shrewsbury, 1831.
- Sermons, and a tract on Regeneration.
