= Mary Ann Knight =

English painter and watercolorist

Mary Anne Knight (7 September 1776 – 1851) was an English miniature-painter, specialising in miniatures of children and babies. She was closely associated with Andrew Plimer, who married her sister.

== Biography ==
Knight was born on 7 September 1776 at Birchin Lane, London, the daughter of Frances Woodcock and John Knight, a City of London merchant. She was one of ten children of the family.

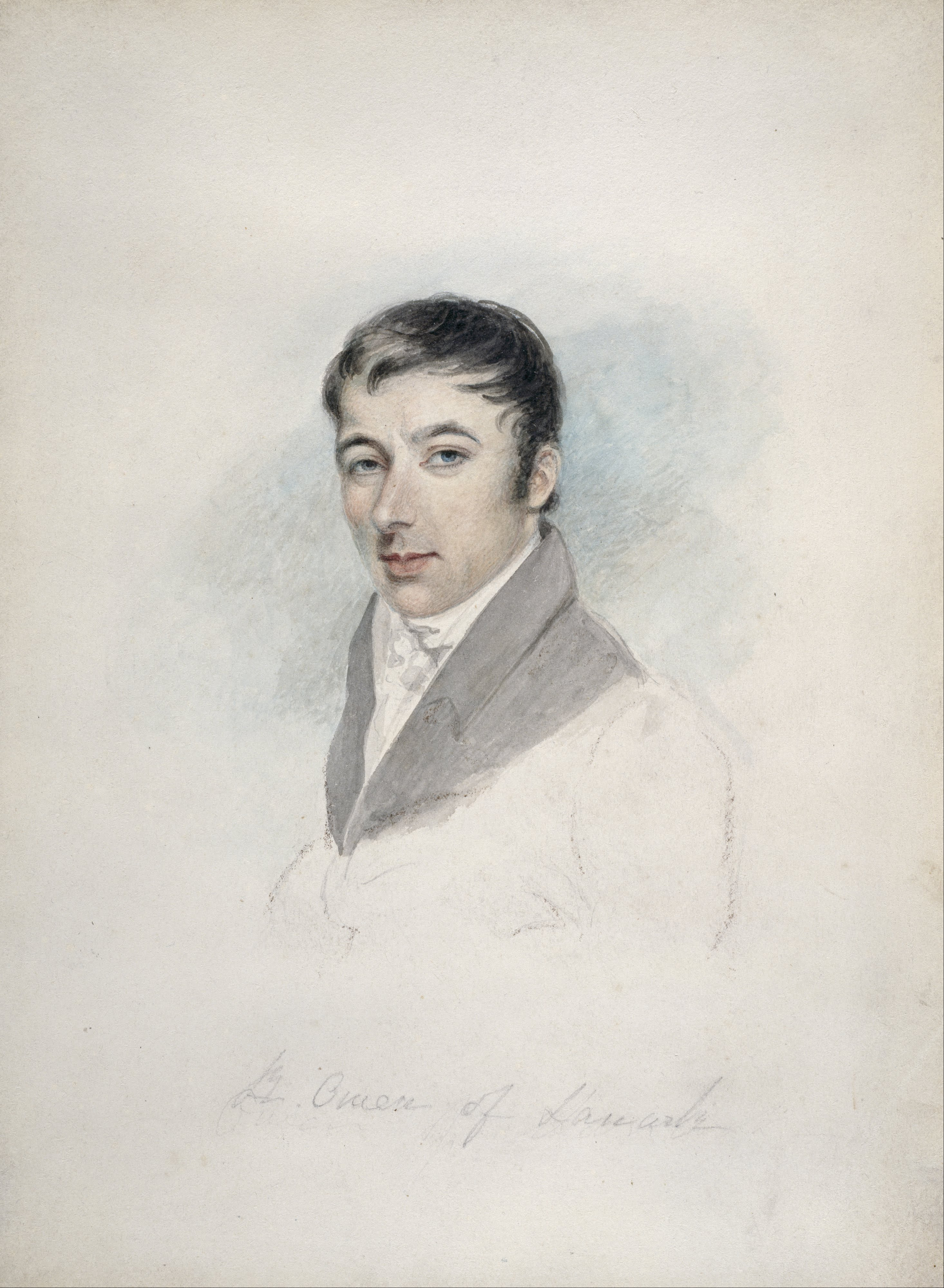
Mary Ann Knight Robert Owen, 1800

At the age of twenty-six she began to paint portraits in order to assist her parents, who had fallen upon hard times, and she received instruction in miniature work from Andrew Plimer. It is stated that it was through her coming for lessons that he made the acquaintance of her elder sister Joanna Louisa, whom he afterwards married. He seems to have retained a considerable affection for Mary Ann, and she spent much of her time at his house. Although she was receiving skills that Plimer himself had been indulgently given by his own master Richard Cosway. She painted portraits from 1802 down to 1836, a period of thirty-four years, and a list of her works, extracted from her note-books, are appended in Williamson (1903)

She kept a very careful account of her earnings, and records that she made the sum of £5,171 9s. 8d., being an average of 150 guineas a year throughout the above period. At first, however, the sums which she obtained for her work were very small, ranging from two to four guineas for a portrait. Occasionally for some years she was able to get five, and even six guineas for a larger portrait, but the average price continued lower than that. Gradually, however, her prices crept up, and at the end of 1805 she was receiving nine guineas for the larger and seven guineas for the smaller size, and ten guineas for portraits of children, with which she was known to be particularly successful. In 1809 ten guineas seems to have been her usual price, and in 1815 this became fifteen guineas, occasionally rising to twenty, and, in a few instances, even to thirty guineas for the portrait of a child.

Miss Knight began to exhibit at the Royal Academy in 1803, and sent in all thirty pictures to that gallery, exhibiting also two unnamed pictures at the Old Water-Colour Society. She ceased work in 1836, having recorded altogether 696 portraits, at an average price of 7.5 guineas apiece. Certain portraits appearing in the Royal Academy catalogues are not to be found in her list, in which there are many curious omissions. Some years have hardly any entries given to them, and nothing at all actually appears marked for the years 1818, 1820, and 1832, although Academy catalogues show her exhibiting in 1818.

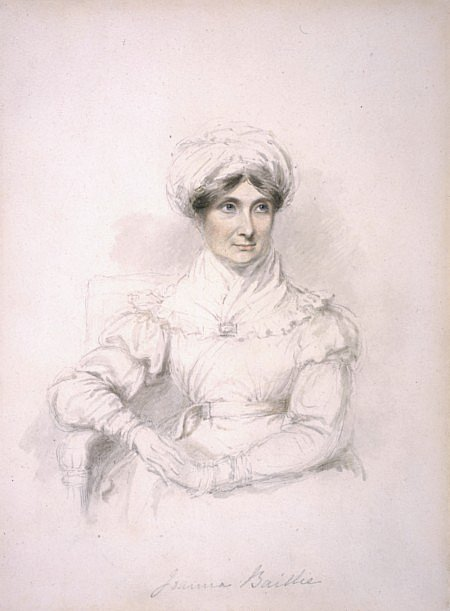
Joanne Baillie by Knight

She resided at one time at Hampstead, but it is not known exactly where, as the word Hampstead is the only address which she gives on her letters. At another time she was at Wicken, Stony Stratford, where her parents were residing. In 1813 her brother in Philadelphia wrote to her at her studio in Old Bond Street. Later on she was again at Hampstead, and towards the end of her life she lived at Grove End Road, St. John's Wood, and there in 1851 she died, at the age of eighty-five.

Comparatively few of her portraits have been identified, although many of them still exist, either attributed to the wrong artists, or marked in catalogues as by unknown hands. The most notable collection of her portraits is a series at Belvoir Castle, representing various members of the Manners family. Another two portraits are of the dramatist Joanne Baillie and the philanthropist Robert Owen are in the National Galleries of Scotland. The picture of Baillie may be a copy as the sitter allowed only one copy to be made as she would not permit an engraving to be made but one of these is in the gallery. The fate of the preparatory sketches she made for these paintings and many those of other people such as Lady Caroline Lamb, her own and the Byron family are now unknown.

The success which Miss Knight obtained in her portraits of children appears to have been the result of her engaging charm, quiet soft voice, merry vivacious manner, and great kindliness of disposition. All these qualities enabled her to appeal to her juvenile sitters, and they were ever ready to listen to her stories and to sit to her for as long as she desired to have them. It is certain that she was able to catch their arch and roguish expression, to represent them as real children, and to capture in her rapid and sketchy portraits excellent likenesses of the little ones with whom she was so popular.

== Critical appraisal ==
Her portraits are generally of large size, and as a rule pale, even somewhat washy in colour, but there are cases in which she has employed a dark and rich scheme of colouring (such as in the portraits of Lady Bagot and Lady Fanny Ponsonby belonging to the Plimer family), and in such instances she was very partial to the use of a rich purple, resembling the bloom of a grape. According to Williamson, it is unfortunate that she was at times influenced by the affected custom of that period, which delighted to depict the children as angels, or in classical attire. Had she confined herself exclusively to genuine portraiture she would have been far more successful, and there is no doubt that her best portraits are those in which she did not aim at any representation of allegorical allusion or classical detail, but was content to paint the child as he was, in a natural attitude.

Her drawing, according to Williamson, is unsatisfactory; the defects in the drawing of arms or of the neck are those of her teacher, and can be found in almost all his best works.

There are a few portraits by her in existence in which she set herself to copy the style of Anthony Stewart, a noted painter of babies at the time, and the portraits which she executed of the infant children of Lady Denbigh are good examples of this special experiment. They possess many of the characteristics of Stewart's work.
