= Grade II* listed buildings in Shropshire =

Shropshire shown within England

The county of Shropshire in England is divided into two unitary authorities: Telford and Wrekin and Shropshire (district). As there are 361 Grade II* listed buildings in the county they have been split into separate lists for both unitary authorities. The Shropshire (district) list has been further sub-divided alphabetically.

- Grade II* listed buildings in Shropshire (district) (A–G)
- Grade II* listed buildings in Shropshire (district) (H–Z)
- Grade II* listed buildings in Telford and Wrekin

== See also ==
- Grade I listed buildings in Shropshire
