= List of people from the Metropolitan Borough of Bolton =

This is a list of notable people from Bolton in North West England. The demonym of Bolton is Boltonian. This list includes people from the towns of Farnworth, Horwich, Westhoughton, Kearsley, Little Lever, Blackrod, and other smaller places within the Metropolitan Borough of Bolton. This list is arranged alphabetically by surname:

Table of contents:
A B C D E F G H I J K L M N O P Q R S T U V W X Y Z
See also • References

== A ==
- Alan Ainscow (born 1953) – former professional footballer (Blackpool, Everton, Blackburn Rovers and Rochdale
- Alyn Ainsworth (1924–1990) – band leader, orchestra conductor and musical director
- Simon Aldred – lead singer of Cherry Ghost
- Tom Aldred (born 1990) – professional footballer with Bury, formerly of Carlisle United, Watford, Accrington Stanley and Blackpool.
- Monica Ali (born 1967) – author, born in East Pakistan (now Bangladesh), but settled and grew up in Bolton, former pupil at Bolton School
- Jean Argles (1925–2023), World War II code breaker and cipher officer
- Sir Richard Arkwright (1732–1792) – inventor of the Water Frame, born in Preston
- Henry Ashworth (1794–1880) – cotton mill owner (Egerton and New Eagley mills) and political reformer, born at Birtenshaw farm, Turton
- Ian Aspinall (born 1961) – actor, played roles in Holby City and East is East
- Gordon Astall (1927–2020) England footballer, born in Horwich
- Gordon Atherton (born 1934), footballer

== B ==
- Hylda Baker (1905–1986) – actress, comedian and music hall star, born in Farnworth
- Alan Ball (1945–2007) – professional footballer, member of the 1966 Football World Cup winning side, born in Farnworth
- Tommy Banks (1929–2024) – Bolton Wanderers and England footballer, born in Farnworth
- Sir Thomas Barlow (1845–1945) – royal physician, born in Edgworth
- Christopher Barrow (born 1982) – cricketer, born Bolton.
- Peter Beighton (1934–2023), South African medical geneticist, born in Bolton
- Niamh Blackshaw (born 1999) – actress, born in Manchester and educated in Bolton
- Danny Boyle (born 1956) – film director, born in Radcliffe, Greater Manchester, but educated in Bolton
- Jack Bond (1932–2019) – cricketer, born in Kearsley
- Liam Boyle (born 1985) – TV and film actor – born in Bolton, but raised in Heywood, Greater Manchester
- Harry Brockbank (born 1998) – professional footballer, ex-Bolton Wanderers, currently El Paso Locomotive in the United States.
- John Brocklehurst (1927–2005) - professional footballer. Born in Horwich
- Jack Bruton (1903–1986) – footballer for Bolton Wanderers, Burnley and England, born in Westhoughton
- Andrew Buchan (born 1979) – TV and stage actor, born in Stockport and brought up in Lostock

== C ==
- Jim Cartwright (born 1958) – Playwright, best known for his first play Road and the play/film Little voice
- Stephen Cartwright (1947–2004) – illustrator
- Katy Cavanagh (born 1973) – English actress, best known for appearances in Coronation Street as Julie Carp from 2008 to 2025, raised in Bolton
- Samuel Taylor Chadwick (1809–1876) – doctor, politician and philanthropist, born in Urmston but raised in Bolton
- Mark Charnock (born 1968) – actor, currently playing Marlon Dingle in Emmerdale
- Gabriel Clark (1998) - Actor, known for Coronation Street and for playing Oliver Morgan in Hollyoaks.
- Phil Clarke – Blackrod- born ex-Rugby league international player and presently Sky Sports pundit
- Tom Clough (1867–1943) – landscape artist
- Sir Daniel Cooper (1821–1902) – first speaker of New South Wales Legislative Assembly
- Thomas Cole (1801–1848) – American landscape painter
- Joel Coleman (born 1995) – current professional footballer with Millwall, formerly of Oldham Athletic, Huddersfield Town, Fleetwood Town, Rochdale, Ipswich Town and Bolton Wanderers.
- Sara Cox (born 1974) – Radio 1 DJ. and TV presenter
- Philip Craven (born 1950) – International Paralympic Committee President
- Samuel Crompton (1753–1827) – inventor of the Spinning Mule
- John Cunliffe (born 1984) – former footballer for Major League Soccer side Chivas USA – born in Bolton and raised in Edgworth
- Sian Charlesworth (born 1987) – member of girl band Parade
- Lee Chambers (psychologist) (born 1985) - psychologist, entrepreneur and radio host.

== D ==
- Charles James Darbishire (1797–1874), Bolton's first mayor, was sympathetic to Chartism and a supporter of the Anti-Corn Law League.
- Julian Darby (born 1967) – ex-footballer, now youth team coach at Bolton Wanderers
- Norman Davies (born 1939) – historian
- Patricia Davies (born 1923), World War II code breaker
- John Davis (1943–2000) – cricketer
- Hilary Devey (1957–2022) – entrepreneur and TV personality, a dragon in BBC2's Dragons' Den (2011), born in Tonge Moor
- Fred Dibnah (1938–2004) – steeplejack, engineer and TV presenter, born in Farnworth
- Sir Benjamin Alfred Dobson (1847–1898) – textile machinery manufacturer and Mayor of Bolton.

== F ==
- Vic Faulkner, (1944–2017) – wrestler, won World of Sport Wrestler of the Year and was European Middleweight Wrestling Champion between 1966 and 1973 and British Welterweight Wrestling Champion between 1973 and 1977.
- William Farrimond (1903–1979) – Lancashire County cricketer
- Shirley Anne Field (born Shirley Broomfield 1938) – stage, film and television actress
- Frank Finlay (1926–2016) – Farnworth-born stage, film and television actor
- Ashley Fletcher (born 1995) – professional footballer, Blackpool, formerly of West Ham United, Middlesbrough and Watford, born in Keighley, raised in Bolton.
- David Flitcroft (born 1974) – professional footballer, Preston North End, Chester City, Rochdale, Macclesfield Town and Bury, ex-manager of Barnsley, Bury, Swindon Town and Mansfield Town, ex-assistant manager at Bolton Wanderers.
- Garry Flitcroft (born 1972) – professional footballer with Manchester City, Blackburn Rovers, Sheffield United and England U21s, ex-manager of Chorley F.C.
- Stu Francis (born 1951) – comedian, Crackerjack presenter
- Peter Freeman (born 1946) – heavyweight boxer, fought Leon Spinks.

== G ==
- Damon Gough (born 1969) known as Badly Drawn Boy – indie singer-songwriter
- John Grisdale (1845–1922) – Bishop of Qu'Appelle, Canada
- Aaron Grundy (born 1988) – ex-professional footballer

== H ==
- Leslie Halliwell (1929–1989) – English film historian and encyclopedist of Halliwell's Film Guide fame
- Charles Hallows (1895–1972) – county cricketer, Wisden Cricketer of the Year, 1928
- James Hallows (1873–1910) – county cricketer, Wisden Cricketer of the Year, 1905.
- Mark Halsey (born 1961) – former English Premier League Referee, lives in Little Lever, born in Essex
- Haseeb Hameed (born 1997) – Nottinghamshire and England cricketer, born in Bolton
- Tom Hamer (born 1999) – professional footballer, currently Lincoln City, formerly Oldham Athletic and Burton Albion.
- John Hanscomb (1924–2019) – retired Conservative politician
- Frank Hardcastle (1844–1908) – businessman, MP and cricketer, born in Tonge
- Jack Harrison (born 1996) – professional footballer for Leeds United and Everton, born in Stoke-on-Trent, raised in Bolton.
- Sam Hart (born 1996) – professional footballer for Sutton United, formerly of Liverpool, Port Vale, Blackburn Rovers, Southend United and Oldham Athletic, born in Horwich
- John Harwood (1893–1964) – invented self-winding wristwatch
- Annie Haslam (born 1947) – lead singer of progressive rock band Renaissance.
- Robert Haslam (1923–2002) – industrialist, born in Bolton
- William Haslam (1850–1898) – gave name to town of Haslam, South Australia
- Paul Heathcote (born 1960) – chef and restaurateur, born in Farnworth
- Stan Heptinstall (born 1946) – Professor of Thrombosis and Haemostasis at University of Nottingham and Mayor of Broxtowe, born in Bolton
- John Hick (1815–1894) – industrialist, partner in B. Hick and Sons, MP and art collector, born in Bolton
- Gordon Hill (born 1928) – League football referee in 1960s and 1970s
- Keith Hill (born 1969) – former professional footballer with Blackburn Rovers and Plymouth Argyle, ex manager of Rochdale, Barnsley, Bolton Wanderers and Tranmere Rovers.
- Charles Holden (1875–1960) – architect, known for designs of London Underground stations
- Simon Holt (born 1958) - composer
- Nicky Hunt (born 1983) – ex-professional footballer having played for Bolton Wanderers, Bristol City, Preston North End, Accrington Stanley, Mansfield Town Leyton Orient and Notts County, born in Westhoughton
- Jack Hylton (1892–1965) – band leader, born in Great Lever

== I ==
- Susan Sutherland Isaacs (1885–1948) – educational psychologist and psychoanalyst, born in Turton

== J ==
- Will Jääskeläinen (born 1998) – professional footballer (Woking)
- David Jack (1898–1958) – footballer for Bolton Wanderers who scored first goal at Wembley, 1923
- Ethel Johnson (1908–1964) – sprinter for Britain at the 1932 Summer Olympics, born in Westhoughton
- Danny Jones (born 1986) – guitarist and vocalist in British pop-rock band McFly, coach on The Voice Kids

== K ==
- Peter Kay (born 1973) – comedian, actor, writer and producer, born in Farnworth
- Vernon Kay (born 1974) – TV presenter and DJ
- Sir Jason Kenny (born 1988) – 2008, 2012 and 2016 Summer Olympics track cycling gold medallist, born in Farnworth. British athlete with most gold medals in history (six)
- Amir Khan (born 1986) – professional boxer (light-welterweight world champion)
- Thomas Penyngton Kirkman (1806–1895) – mathematician, FRS
- Andy Knowles (born 1981) – musician and artist
- Tony Knowles (born 1955) – snooker player
- Sir Harold Kroto (1939–2016) – chemist, Nobel Prize winner in 1996 for his work on Buckminsterfullerene, born in Wisbech, raised in Bolton

== L ==
- Roy Lancaster (born 1938) – gardener and broadcaster, Gardeners' World, born in Farnworth
- Thomas Lancashire (born 1985) – professional runner, represented Britain at the 2008 Summer Olympics
- William Lassell (1799–1880) – astronomer, discoverer of the moons Ariel and Triton
- Tommy Lawton (1919–1996) – professional footballer, Burnley, Everton, Arsenal, Chelsea and England, born in Farnworth
- Francis Lee (1944–2023) – footballer with Bolton Wanderers, Manchester City, Derby County, and England (27 caps)
- James Darcy Lever (1854–1910) – born in Bolton, co-founder of Lever Brothers, which became Unilever
- William Lever, 1st Viscount Leverhulme (1851–1925) – born in Bolton, co-founder of Lever Brothers which became Unilever.
- Ralf Little (born 1980) – actor, star of The Royle Family, Two Pints of Lager and a Packet of Crisps and Children's Ward, born in Oldham, educated at Bolton School
- Nat Lofthouse (1925–2011) – footballer, played for Bolton Wanderers and England
- Kate Long (born 1964) – bestselling author of The Bad Mother's Handbook, brought up in Blackrod
- Peter Lown (born 1947) – born in Bolton, a Canadian field hockey player, competing in the 1976 Summer Olympics.
- Captain Stanley Lord (1877–1962) – captain of the SS Californian, the ship closest to RMS Titanic as she sank
- Stan Lynn (1928–2002) - professional footballer (Accrington Stanley, Aston Villa and Birmingham City)

== M ==
- Sajid Mahmood (born 1981) – Lancashire and England cricketer.
- Paul Mariner (1953–2021) – professional footballer with Plymouth Argyle, Ipswich Town, Arsenal and Portsmouth, born in Farnworth and grew-up in Horwich.
- George Marsh (1515–1555) – born in Deane, a Protestant martyr for his faith at Boughton, Chester
- Lee Mason (born 1971) – English Premier League referee, educated at Thornleigh Salesian College in Bolton
- Paddy McGuinness (born 1973) – stand-up comedian and comedy actor
- Sir Ian McKellen (born 1939) – stage and film actor, born in Burnley and educated at Bolton School
- William Meadows (1833–1920) – American politician, served in the Wisconsin State Assembly
- Thomas Moran (1837–1926) – American landscape painter
- Diane Morgan (born 1975) – Actress, comedian, and writer
- Daniel Mortimer (1978) - born in Bolton, educated at Canon Slade. Served with distinction in the RAF, awarded 6 medals including Afghanistan, Libya and Iraq/Syria campaign medals. Radio DJ on Airshow FM (Lincolnshire) Wrote 3 books (unpublished) and acclaimed actor with roles in Peter Pan and Pinocchio (Theatre Church, Bolton) and as George Stephenson in “The Lancashire Witch” (Octagon Theatre)
- Geoffrey Moorhouse (1931–2009) – travel writer, novelist and poet
- Thomas Sutcliffe Mort (1816-1878) - Industrialist, benefactor, Australian businessman
- Clive Myrie (born 1964) – BBC news correspondent and presenter

== N ==
- Carlo Nash (born 1973) – footballer with Crystal Palace, Stockport County, Manchester City, Middlesbrough, Preston North End, Wigan Athletic, Everton and Stoke City
- Bill Naughton (1910–1992) – author and playwright, born in Ireland but educated in Bolton, work often being set in the town, in which he grew up
- Paul Nicholls (born 1979) – TV and film actor in EastEnders, City Central and Ackley Bridge
- Oliver Norburn (born 1992) – footballer, currently playing for Blackpool and the Grenada national team.
- David Norwood (born 1968) – chess grand master, chess writer, and businessman, represents Andorra at chess.

== O ==
- Andrew Oldcorn (born 1960) – professional golfer, born in Bolton and brought up in Edinburgh
- Glyn Owen (1928–2004) – stage and TV actor

== P ==
- Tom Parker, (1988–2022) – member of pop boy band The Wanted
- Maxine Peake (born 1974) – actress, played in Shameless, born in Westhoughton
- Jimmy Phillips (born 1966) – Former Professional Footballer with Bolton Wanderers, Rangers, Oxford United and Middlesbrough.
- Nathaniel Phillips (born 1997) – Professional Footballer with Liverpool.
- Dick Pollard (1912–1985) – test cricketer, born in Westhoughton
- Mike Pollitt (born 1972) – goalkeeper coach for Preston North End, born in Farnworth.
- Eva Pope (born 1967) – actress, born in Wigan
- David Andrew Phoenix (born 1966) – biochemist and educationalist
- Hovis Presley, real name: Richard Henry McFarlane (1960–2005) – poet and comedian

== R ==
- Mark Radcliffe (born 1958) – Radio 2 DJ, TV presenter and writer – educated at Bolton School
- Dorning Rasbotham (c. 1730–1791) – writer, antiquarian and artist, High Sheriff of Lancashire for 1769, born in Manchester
- John Frankland Rigby (1933–2014), mathematician
- John Roberts, founder of AO World
- Sir Arthur Rostron (1869–1940) – Captain of RMS Carpathia, first ship to aid the RMS Titanic, educated at Bolton School
- David Ruffley (born 1962) – politician, Conservative MP for Bury St Edmunds, educated at Bolton School
- Jenny Ryan (born 1982) – television personality, professional quizzer on ITV quiz show The Chase

== S ==
- Charles Allan Shaw (1927–1989) – Dean of Bulawayo, then of Ely, born in Westhoughton
- Robert Shaw (1927–1978) – actor and writer, born in Westhoughton, moved to Scotland as a child
- Nigel Short (born 1965) – chess grand master, educated at Bolton School
- Gerard Corley Smith (1909–1997) – diplomat and environmentalist
- Denys Corley Smith (1922–1989) – author and journalist
- Hannah Spencer (born 1991) - Green Party of England and Wales politician and MP for Gorton and Denton
- Dave Spikey (born 1951) – actor, comedian, writer and film producer
- Dale Stephens (born 1989) – professional footballer with Burnley FC
- Adam James Syddall (born 1980) - cricketer

== T ==
- Françoise Taylor (1920–2007) – artist, born in Belgium, but lived and worked in Bolton for over 50 years, noted for 1950s Bolton street scenes
- Thomas Taylor (1851–1916) – cotton-mill owner, MP for Bolton 1912–1916
- Thomas Thomasson (1808–1876) – cotton spinner, political economist and benefactor
- John Pennington Thomasson (1841–1904) – cotton spinner, MP and benefactor
- Frank Tyson (1930–2015) – Northants and England cricketer – known as "Typhoon Tyson"

== W ==
- Mike Watkinson (born 1961) – ex-England cricketer, formally coach for Lancashire, born in Westhoughton
- Al Weaver (born 1981) – actor, plays a fledgling Anglican curate in TV series Grantchester (since 2014).
- Keith Welch (born 1968) – former professional footballer with Rochdale, Bristol City and Northampton Town.
- Simon Whaley (born 1985) – Former professional footballer, Bury, Preston North End, Norwich City, Chesterfield and Doncaster Rovers
- Robert Whitehead (1823–1905) – developed first self-propelled torpedo and great-grandfather of the Von Trapp children (Sound of Music), born in Little Bolton
- Jason Wilcox (born 1971) – Former professional footballer, Blackburn Rovers, Leeds United and England
- Sophie Willan (born 1987) - actor/comedienne.
- Thomas Willoughby, 11th Baron Willoughby of Parham (c. 1602 – 1691/92) – peer in the House of Lords
- Sammy Winward (born 1985) – actress, singer and model, notably playing Katie Sugden in Emmerdale
- Bernard Wrigley (born 1948) – comedian, actor, playwright and musician

== See also ==
- List of mayors of Bolton
- List of Bolton Wanderers F.C. managers
- List of Bolton Wanderers F.C. players
- List of people from Greater Manchester
