= Zip line =

Transportation system

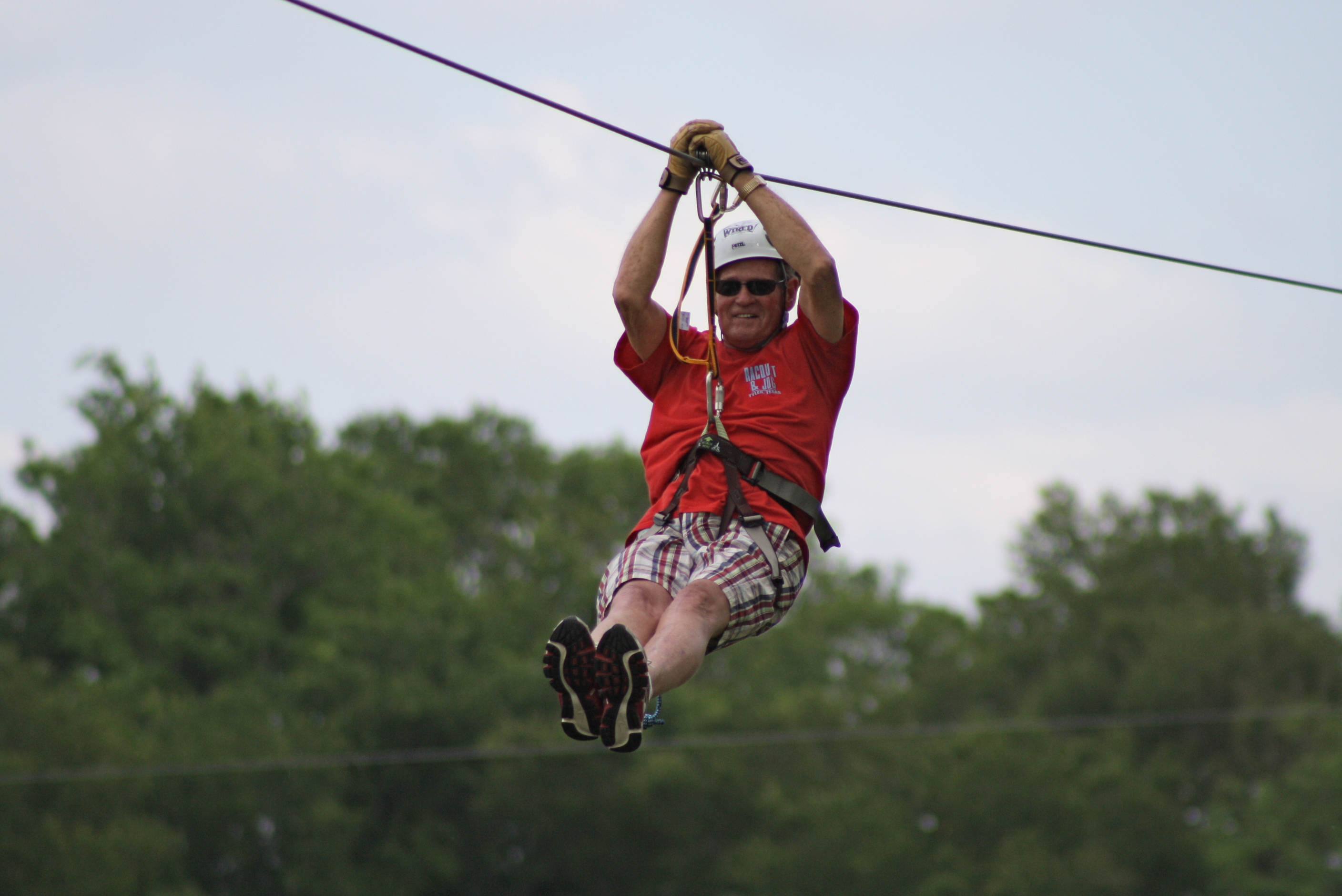
A person on a zip-line

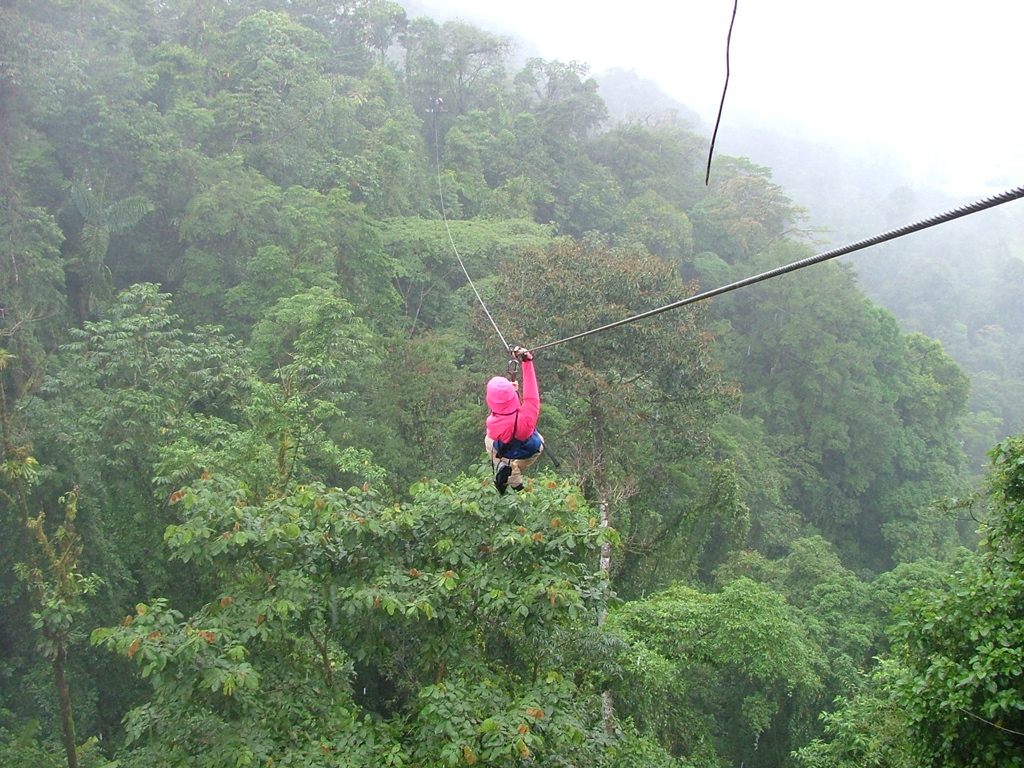
Zip-lining in Costa Rica, January 2005

A zip-line, zip line, zip-wire, flying fox, or death slide is a pulley suspended on a cable, usually made of stainless steel, mounted on a slope. It is designed to enable cargo or a person propelled by gravity to travel from the top to the bottom of the inclined cable by holding on to, or being attached to, the freely moving pulley. It has been described as essentially a Tyrolean traverse that engages gravity to assist its speed of movement. Its use is not confined to adventure sport, recreation, or tourism, although modern-day usage tends to favor those meanings.

== History ==
Ropeways or aerial cables have been used as a method of transport in some mountainous countries for more than 2,000 years, possibly starting in China, India and Japan as early as 250 BC, remaining in use in some remote areas in China such as Nujiang (Salween) valley in Yunnan as late as 2015 before being replaced by bridges. Not all of these structures were assisted by gravity, so not all fitted the definition of the zip-line.

Various technological advances in Europe in the Middle Ages improved the power-line's ropeways, some of which were still assisted by gravity.

The first recorded use of the zip-line as a form of entertainment was possibly in 1739, when Robert Cadman, a steeplejack and rope slider, died when descending from Shrewsbury's St Mary's Church when his rope snapped. In literature, one appears in H. G. Wells's 1897 novel The Invisible Man as part of a Whit Monday fair: "On the village green an inclined string, down which, clinging the while to a pulley-swung handle, one could be hurled violently against a sack at the other end, came in for considerable favour among the adolescent..."

Some sources attribute the development of zip-lines used today as a vacation activity to the Tyrolean traverses developed for mountaineering purposes.

In the Australian outback, zip-lines were sometimes used for delivering necessities to people working in or on the other side of a valley, and they may have been used in conflicts by Australian troops to deliver food, mail and even ammunition to forward positions.

In 1983, Holger Bethke used an improvised zipline to surmount the Berlin Wall and defect from East Germany.

== Current uses ==
=== As a means of transport ===
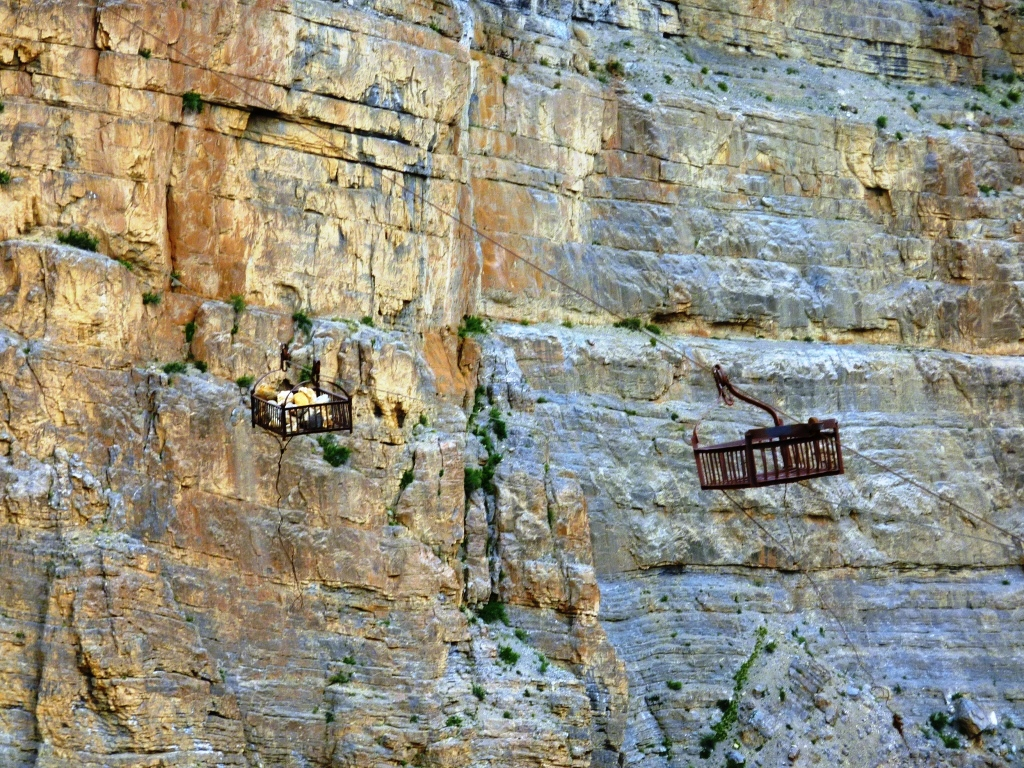
Zip-line across river chasm in Ladakh, India

Yungas, Bolivia, features a system of zip-lines used for transporting harvested crops, mainly coca, across a valley 200 m below. They can also be seen in the Ladakh region of India.

In recent years, there has been renewed interest in the use of aerial ropeways for transporting cargo, partly due to their low energy requirements and environmental impact. Gravity-fed types, i.e. zip-lines, have been built in Nepal, Latin America and India.

Ziplines have also been used as a means of transporting items in Australian regions in the past. These may include ammunition, weapons, tools, food, and mail.

=== Recreation ===
==== Children's adventure playgrounds ====
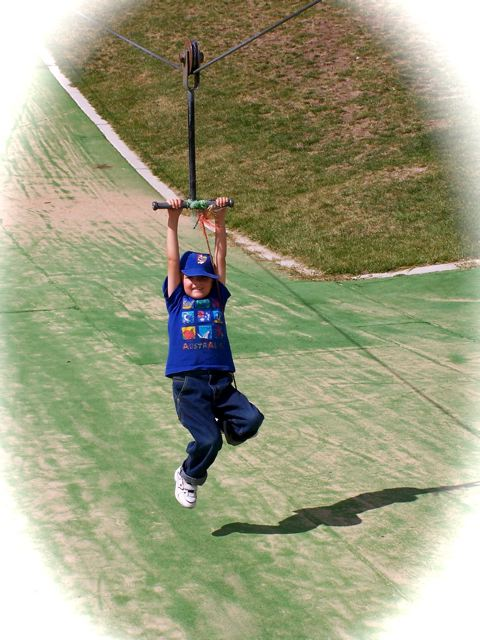
Flying fox at Gungahlin, Canberra, Australia

Zip-lines may be designed for children's play and found on some adventure playgrounds. Inclines are fairly shallow and so the speeds kept relatively low, removing the need for a means of stopping. The term "flying fox" is commonly used in reference to such a small-scale zip-line in Australia, New Zealand, and Scotland. With playground equipment, the pulleys are fixed to the cable, the user typically hanging onto a handgrip underneath, but occasionally including a seat or a safety strap. Short zip-lines in playgrounds are also called "cableways", with a spring stopper at the end. Return of the grip or seat is usually done by simply pushing or pulling it via a short wire back to the top of the hill on foot.

==== Canopy tours and adventure zip-lining ====
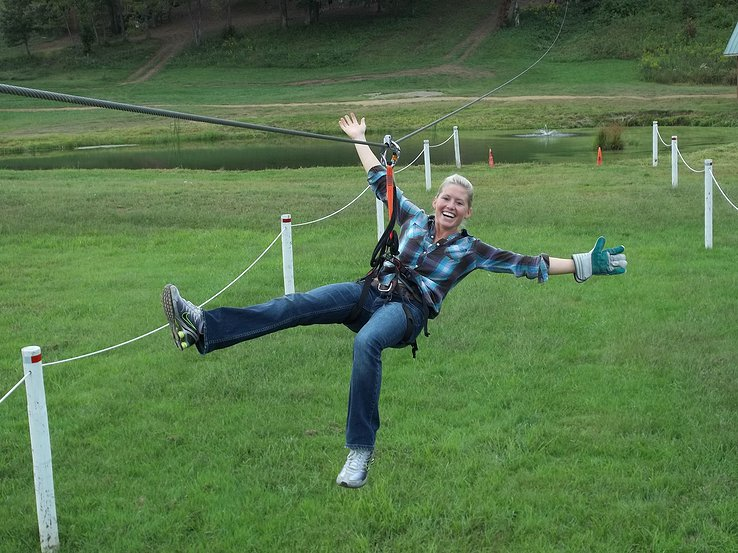
Hocking Peaks Adventure Park, Logan, Ohio

Longer and higher rides are often used as a means of accessing remote areas, such as a rainforest canopy. In the 1970s, wildlife biologists set up zip-lines as a way to study and explore the dense rainforests of Costa Rica without disturbing the environment. The business idea for zip-line canopy tours developed from these. Darren Hreniuk, a Canadian citizen who moved to Costa Rica in 1992, around the same time that a scene in the film Medicine Man incorporated the treetop rides, with the goal of using canopy tours to help raise awareness for reforestation, education and socio-economic development in the surrounding areas. In October 1998, the Costa Rican Patent Office granted patent No. 2532 for an "Elevated Forest Transport System Propelled by Gravity, Using Harness and Pulley Through a Simple Horizontal Line" to Hreniuk. The patent was later annulled, bringing uncertainty to zip-line businesses, before being reinstated after twenty years.

A canopy tour (sometimes called a zip-line tour) provides a route through a wooded, and often mountainous, landscape, making primary use of zip-lines and aerial bridges between platforms built in trees. Tourists are harnessed to a cable for safety, and many are restricted to adults. Heights vary from near to the ground to near the treetops. Canopy tours are largely marketed under the banner of ecotourism, although the environmental impact of any type of zip-line is a disputed topic.

The terminology varies (canopy tour, zip-lining, flying fox), and the distinction between using zip-lines for ecotourism and zip-lining as an adventure sport is often not clear. Zip-line tours are now popular vacation activities, found both at upscale resorts and at outdoor adventure camps, where they may be an element on a larger challenge such as a hike or ropes course.

== Operation ==
=== Mechanism ===
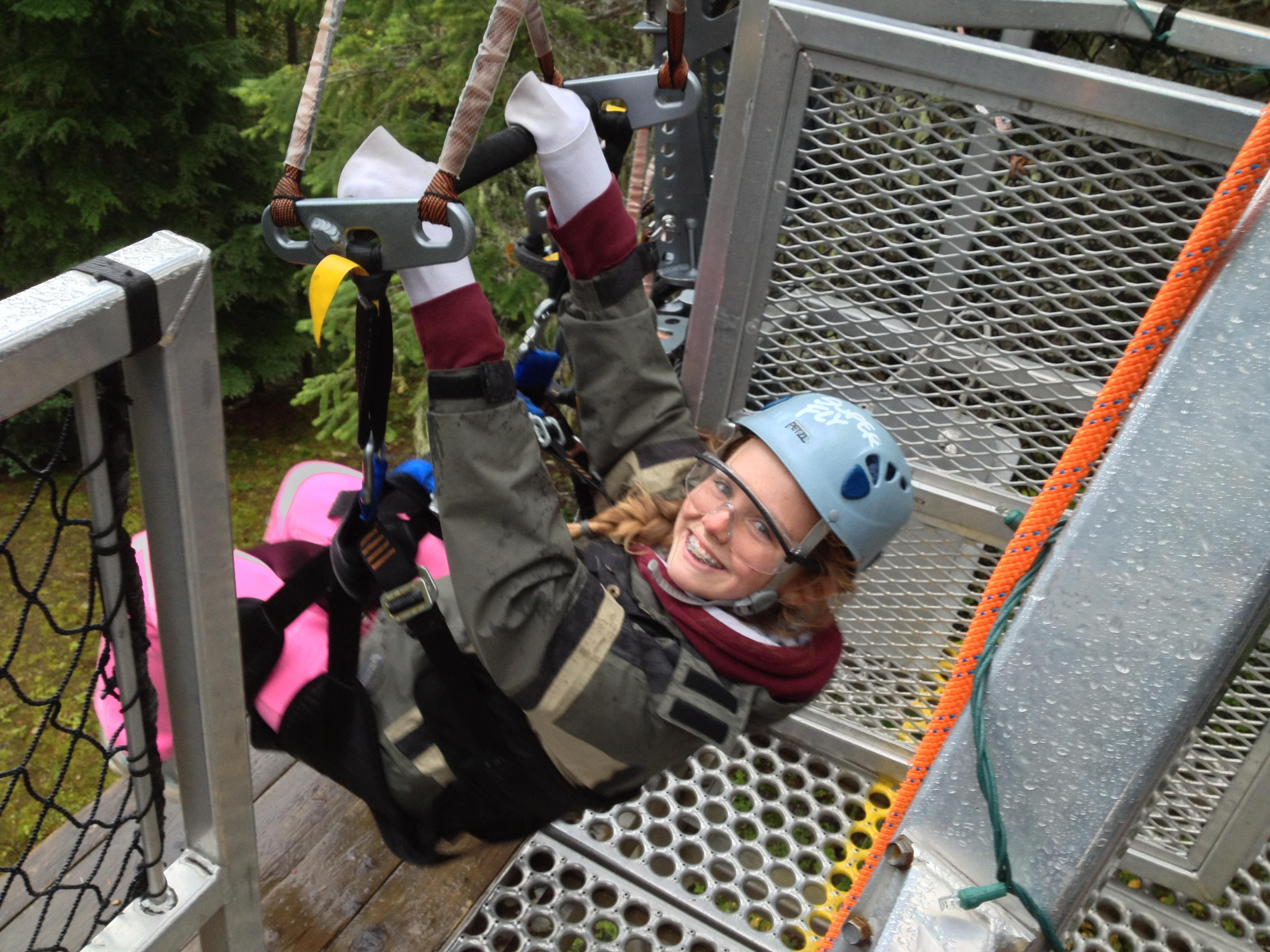
Departure zip SuperFly in Whistler, British Columbia, Canada

A type of pulley with a grooved wheel known as a sheave is used in zip-lines, and the pulley turns as it travels along, thus reducing friction and enabling greater speed than would otherwise be possible.

The zip-line trolley ("zipliner") is the frame or assembly together with the pulley inside that run along the cable. Zip-lines also have some kind of device to allow the cargo or rider to attach to the pulley system. This could include a harness, seat, a cabin or often just a handhold in smaller playground applications, that attaches to the pulley by a pivoting link or carabiner which secures the load, allowing the person or cargo to travel down the line.

==== Braking ====
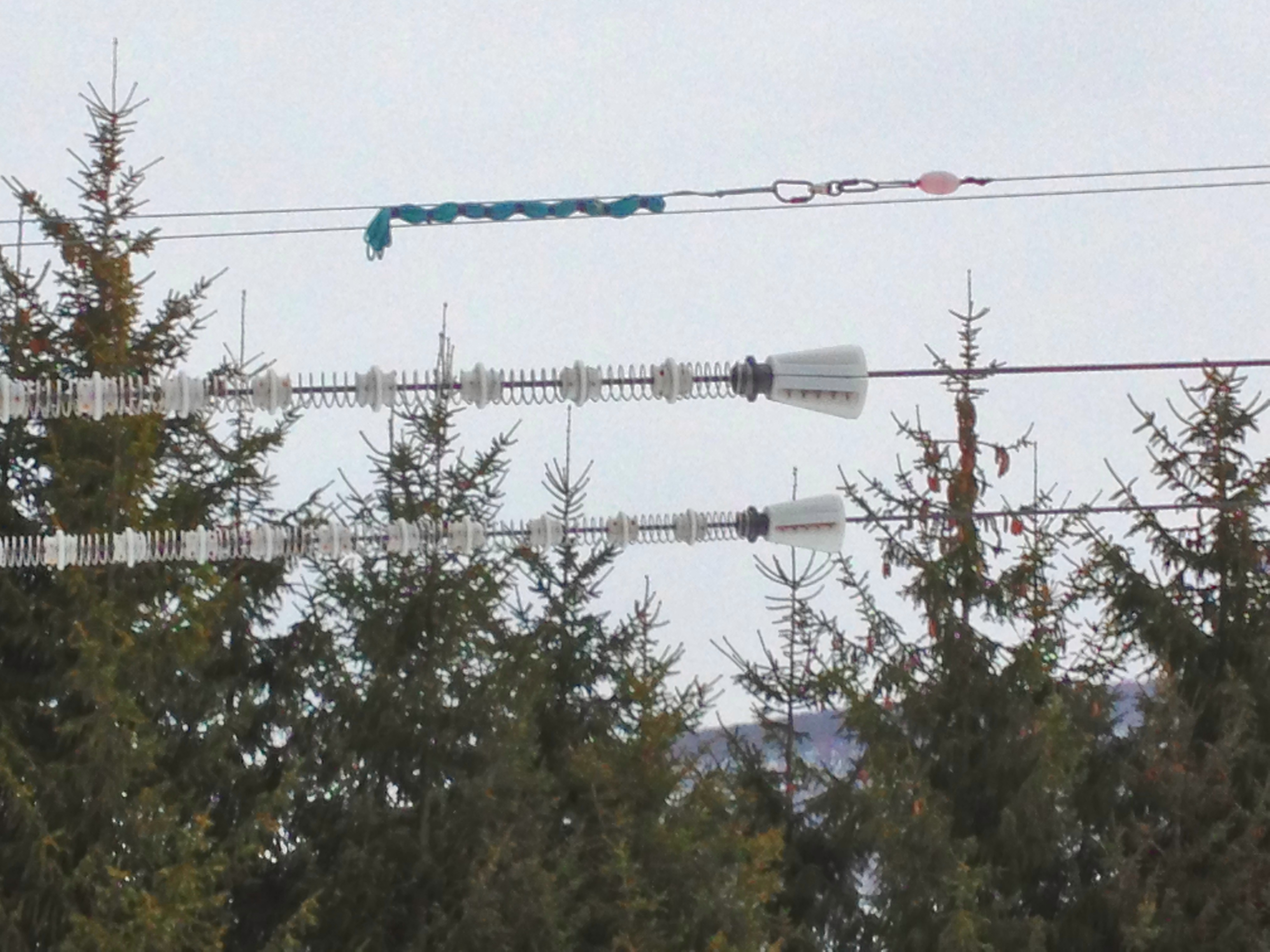
Zip-line spring braking system

To be propelled by gravity, the cable needs to be on a fairly steep slope. Even then, the rider or cargo will often not travel completely to the end (although this will depend on the load), and some means of safely stopping the car at the bottom end is usually needed with the larger zip-lines. Users of zip-lines must have some means of stopping themselves. Typical mechanisms include:

- Friction created from the pulley rubbing against the cable
- Thick, purpose-built leather gloves
- A mat or netting at the lower end of the incline
- A passive arrester system composed of springs, pulleys, counterweights, bungee cord, tire or other devices, which slows and then stops the trolley's motion
- A "capture block", which is a block on the cable tethered to a rope controlled by a person who can manually apply friction on the rope to slow the user down
- Gravity stop, exploiting the sag in the cable, where the belly of the cable is always lower than the termination point. The amount of net incline in a zip-line system affects the speed at which the user arrives at the termination point.
- Hand brake at the end of the zip-line

=== Safety ===
There are certain precautions that can be taken. Riders are physically attached to the cable by a harness which attaches to a removable trolley. A helmet is required on almost all courses of any size. All zip-line cables have some degree of sag, so the proper tensioning of a cable is important and allows tuning the ride of a zip-line.

== Records ==
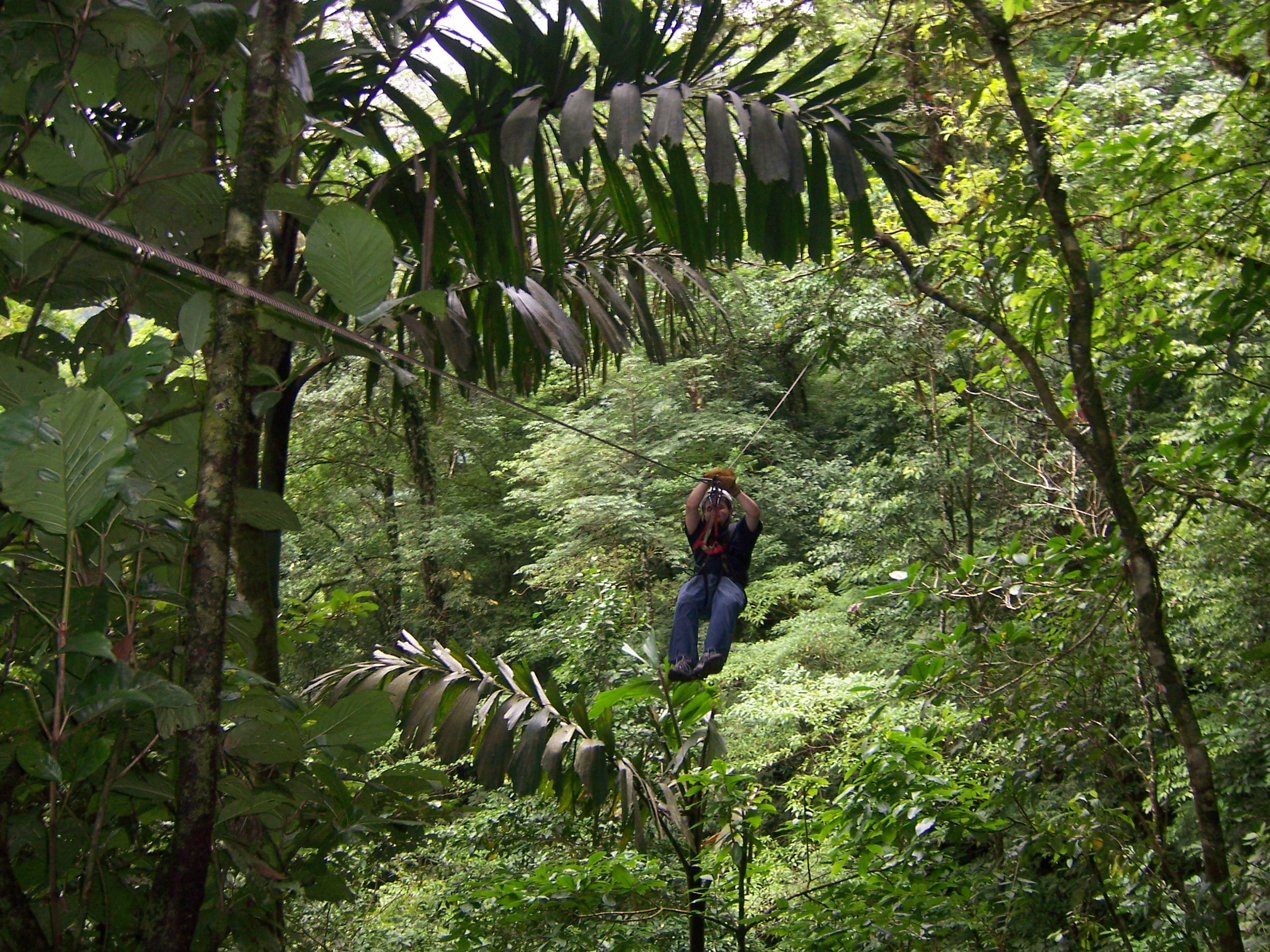
Zip-lining through rainforest at San Lorenzo in San Ramón (canton)

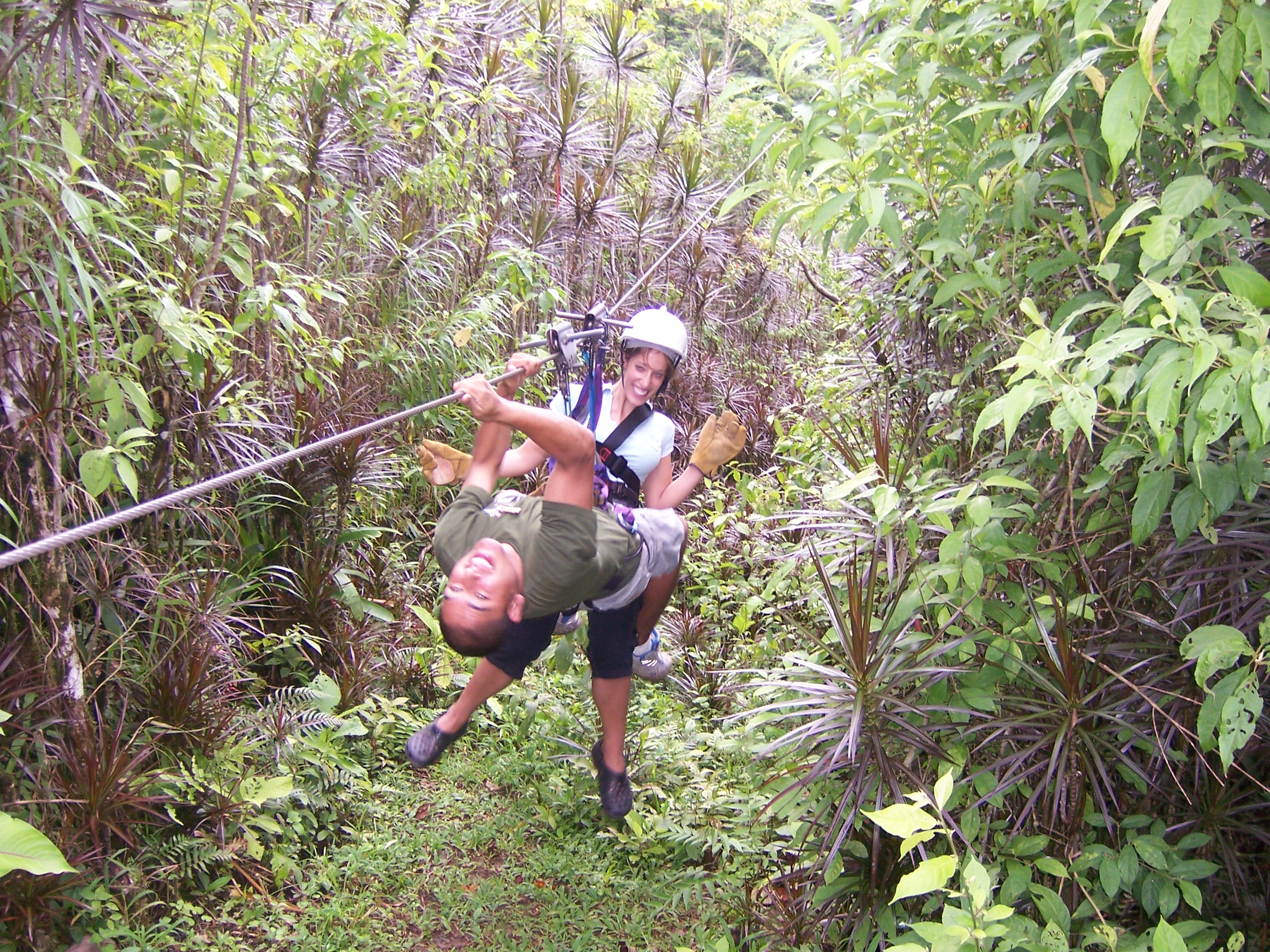
Rescuing a stuck zip-liner

=== Longest ===
The world's longest zip-line, which opened on 28 September 2024, is the K3 of the SA Forest Adventures in Caledon, South Africa. It is a single cable of 3.2 kilometres (2.0 mi) reaching speeds up to 120 kilometres per hour (75 mph).

The previous record holder was the "Jebel Jais Flight", which was sited on one of the peaks of the Jebel Jais mountain in Ras Al Khaimah, United Arab Emirates, with a single unbroken span of 2,831.88 metres (9,290.9 ft). The ride, which opened in 2018, was temporarily closed later that year pending the outcome into an investigation into the fatal crash of an Agusta 139 rescue helicopter that was believed to have clipped one of the ride's cables.

The "Parque de Aventura Barrancas del Cobre" at 2,545 m (8,350 ft) in Copper Canyon, Mexico, is the second-longest span, with "El Monstruo" at Orocovis in Puerto Rico coming in third, at 2,530 m (8,300 ft).

The Skywire at Bluewater in Kent is the longest in England at 725 metres (2,379 ft). The longest zip-line in Europe, at 2,300 metres (7,500 ft), is the Sternsauser in Hoch-Ybrig, Switzerland.

The Zip World Bethesda line in Penrhyn Quarry, Bethesda, Wales holds the world record for attaining the fastest zip-line travel speed.

=== Steepest ===
Zip-lines with the steepest inclines include:

- Saint Martin's Rockland Estate Rainforest Adventures zip-line (opened 24 November 2017) drops 320 metres (1,050 ft) across the 853 metres (2,799 ft) of cable.
- The Letalnica bratov Gorišek zip-line, on the ski jumping hill in Planica, Slovenia (opened 19 September 2015) is 566 metres (1,857 ft) long with a 202 metres (663 ft) vertical drop. It has an average 38.33% and a maximum 58.6% incline.
- ZipFlyer in Nepal (run by HighGround Adventures – 2012), with a maximum incline of 56%, claims to be the world's steepest zip-line. It has a vertical drop of 610 metres (2,000 ft).

=== Oldest person to ride a zip-line ===
- On his 106th birthday, British great-grandfather Jack Reynolds became the oldest person to ride a zip-line, on 6 April 2018, at Go Ape in Grizedale Forest, Cumbria.

=== Highest elevation zipline ===
The Tyrolienne du Mont-Fort in Verbier, Switzerland is the highest altitude zipline, at 3,329 metres (10,922 ft).

== See also ==
- Adventure park
- Aerial tramway
- Breeches buoy
