= Gay Meadow =

Former home stadium of Shrewsbury Town F.C. (1910-2007)

Coordinates: 52°42′29.42″N 2°44′51.74″W

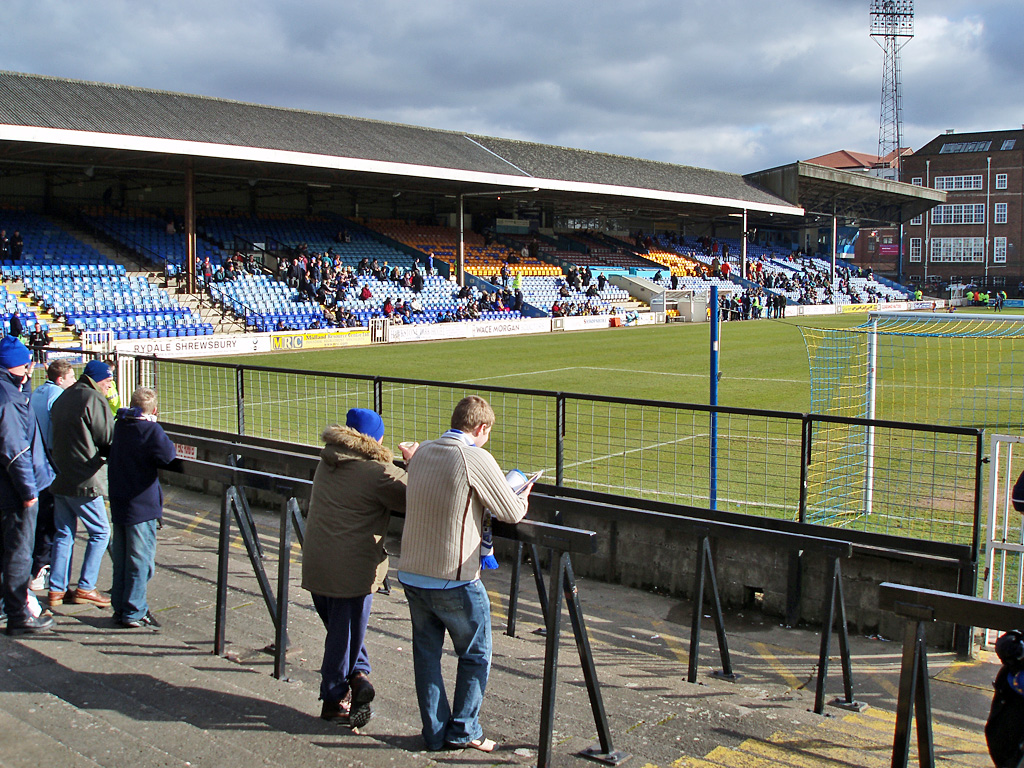
- Crowd at the Gay Meadow on 25 February 2006
- Interactive map of Gay Meadow
- Full name: Gay Meadow
- Location: Abbey Foregate; Shrewsbury; SY2 6AB
- Capacity: 8,000 (3,639 seated)
- Field size: 114 x 74 yards

Construction
- Built: 1910
- Opened: 1910
- Closed: 2007
- Demolished: 2007

Tenant
- Shrewsbury Town (1910–2007)

Gay Meadow was a football ground in Shrewsbury, Shropshire, England, serving as the home ground of Shrewsbury Town. Located on the banks of the River Severn, it opened in 1910.

The ground closed at the end of the 2006–07 Football League season and the club moved to a new stadium, provisionally titled The New Meadow, on the outskirts of the town.

Local legend says that over 22,000 were inside the stadium for the league match against Wrexham on 21 August 1950, although the official figure is given as 16,000. The official record attendance is 18,917, set on 26 April 1961 against local rivals Walsall. Because it had only one entrance/exit road, in the years following the Taylor Report the capacity of the ground was reduced from 16,000 to around 8,000.

== Early history of Gay Meadow ==
Centuries before Shrewsbury Town occupied the site, Gay Meadow was known locally for the fairs, carnivals and circuses which took place there.

The origin of the name is not entirely clear, although it is widely believed to be related to a use for entertainment purposes. One suggestion by local historian J.L. Hobbs, is that it is of Norman influence and that the ground was a monastic park attached to Shrewsbury Abbey. Other suggested origins are the Welsh word Cae, a field, or Old English words galla, barren wet land, or gat, a goat. An alternative origin states that the land was originally owned by the Gay family, first represented by a "Richard Gegh" (sic) of 'Monks Foriet' (later Abbey Foregate) recorded in 1349.

In 1739, stuntman Robert Cadman, a "steeple-flyer", attempted to "fly" across the River Severn using a rope attached to St Mary's Church at one side and a tree at Gay Meadow some 200 feet below. The rope broke and he plunged to his death.

=== First matches ===
In 1910, Shrewsbury Town were looking for a new ground to play at, having been told they could no longer use the Army-owned pitch at Copthorne Barracks. A consortium bought the site and leased it to the club. Despite objections from the local hospital, the Salop Infirmary, who feared crowd noise might disturb patients across the River Severn, the first official match took place on 20 August 1910, when a crowd of up to 1,000 watched a pre-season practice match between the "Reds" and the "Whites".

The first league game at Gay Meadow was between Shrewsbury Town and Wolverhampton Wanderers Reserves on 10 September 1910. Shrewsbury lost the match 2–1, with "Shinton" scoring the first league goal for Wolves, and Billy Scarratt scoring Shrewsbury Town's first goal at the ground. Shrewsbury's first win at Gay Meadow occurred two weeks later against Halesowen.

=== Ground improvements ===
The ground did not see major improvements until the mid-1950s, when trees which lined The Narrows, the road leading to Gay Meadow, were felled to improve access. It was around this time that the club's supporters launched a floodlight committee in order to raise £12,000 for the installation of floodlights. On 25 November 1960, a crowd of 5,448 saw Shrewsbury Town beat Stoke City 5–0 in a match to mark the installation of the lights. The previous Saturday, over 10,000 witnessed the turning on of the lights in the game against Queens Park Rangers. The floodlights formed part of the Shrewsbury skyline for almost 47 years.

New offices were built at the ground in 1965, with the Riverside terrace being built in the early 1970s. This terrace would gain legendary status amongst home fans in years to come.

In the early 1980s, the club's promotion to the Second Division meant the ground required further improvements. The old 600-seater Station Stand was demolished and a new 4,500 capacity centre stand built. This was the last major building work to take place at the ground before its closure. Minor changes in the 1990s included a new Executive Suite, a TV gantry in the Main Stand, the controversial demolition of the ground's wooden scoreboard, and, following the Taylor Report, the removal of perimeter fencing with the exception of the away Station End.

== General overview ==
Gay Meadow was located on the banks of the River Severn and was surrounded by trees and parkland, with the town centre towering above the ground on the hilltop behind. A number of the town's landmarks, including Shrewsbury Castle and Shrewsbury Abbey, were visible from the ground.

For many years, Shrewsbury coracle maker Fred Davies would sit in his coracle during home matches and retrieve stray footballs from the river. Although Davies died long ago, his legend is still associated with the club.

Due to the ground being small and in a cramped location, between the river and a major railway junction, there was little scope for expansion or renovation. Access was via a small side street known as The Narrows and one of the main reasons the ground's capacity was reduced following the Taylor Report. Problems with evacuation and access for emergency services was one of the reasons cited by the club for moving to a new ground.

=== North ===
Station End - So named due to its proximity to the town's railway station. A partially covered terrace, normally allocated to visiting fans, although it was also a home terrace until the 1970s. Its capacity, depending on the away allocation, ranged from 1,500 to 2,000. Unusually it kept the bottom half of its perimeter fencing right up until its final game, most other stadia in the country having removed theirs following the Taylor Report. It was also notable for housing the oldest working football turnstile in the country, although this was only used on rare occasions. When the ground closed, the old turnstile sold for £3,050 at an auction staged at the ground on 17 June 2007, to a local Shrewsbury Town fan.

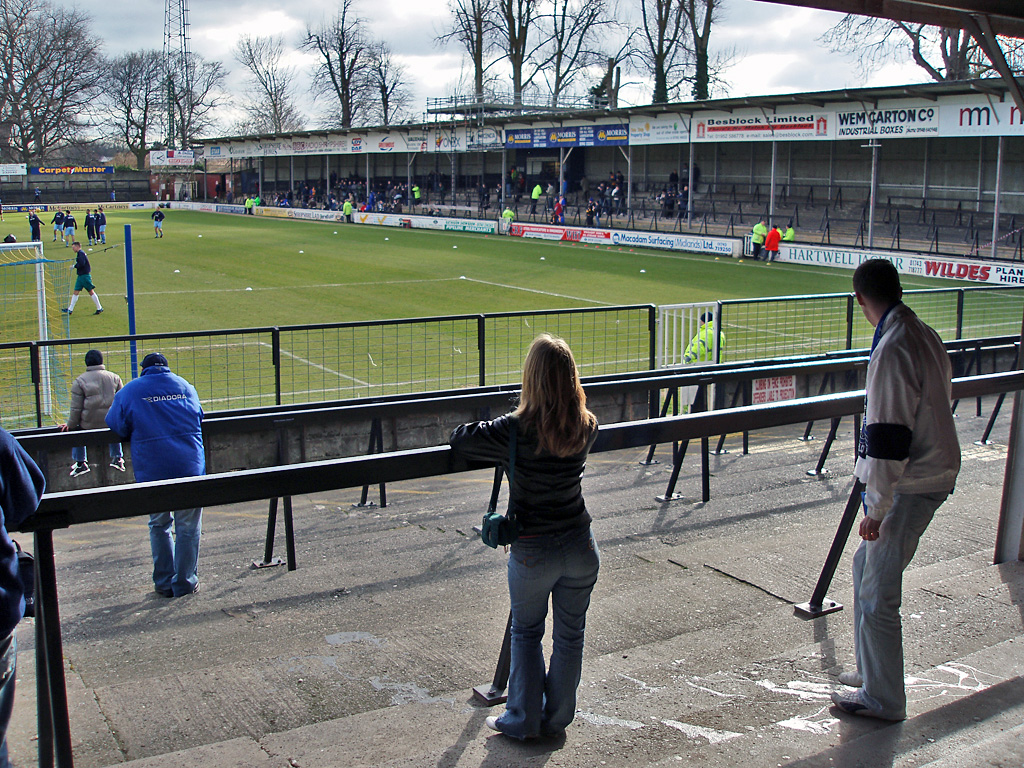
Riverside Terrace viewed from the Station End

=== West ===
Riverside Terrace - So named due to its position on the bank of the River Severn. The Riverside was a partially covered terrace running the length of the pitch, with a refreshments bar situated halfway along the terrace and roof mounted TV gantry (used only occasionally for high-profile matches). This part of the ground was where the liveliest element of the home crowd were to congregate, with the most vocal of home chanting and support coming from supporters from "The Riverside", with frequent exchanges with visiting fans often heard. Famously, stray footballs were often kicked over this stand into the Severn, to be retrieved by a man in a coracle named Fred Davies, (not to be confused with the manager of the same name who was in charge between 1993 and 1997).

=== South ===
Wakeman (or Tech) End - So named due to the Wakeman School (formerly a technical grammar school) being directly behind it. It was an open terrace, with the windows of the school overlooking the pitch. This side of the ground along with the Riverside Terrace formed one large standing area for home fans, with movement unrestricted between the two. This often resulted in home fans congregating behind the goal on the Wakeman End when Shrewsbury Town were attacking in that direction - leaving the north part of the Riverside Terrace practically empty. The combined capacity of the Riverside and Wakeman Terraces was between 3,000 and 3,500 - depending on the size of the away following.

=== East ===
The east side of the ground was a covered, all-seater section. Limited seating for away fans was also available. The stand also boasted executive seating for VIPs, sponsors and guests, a TV gantry and press offices. The east side of the ground was also adjacent to the club's offices, function rooms and official player's/supporter's bar. Although consisting of a single stand generally referred to as the Main Stand, it was split into four enclosures, as follows:

Wakeman Stand - So named due to its proximity to the Wakeman School. A covered, all seater stand for 1,000 home supporters.

Centre Stand - So named due to forming the central part of the seated area. A covered, all seater stand for 1,000 home supporters. It also housed the directors' box.

Family enclosure - This was a designated area for families consisting of 700 seats, with admission via designated "family" tickets.

Station Stand - A seated section for away fans, holding roughly 250 away fans

== The move to New Meadow ==
Whilst Gay Meadow was well regarded by fans and traditionalists within the English game, the ground was in a cramped location between the River Severn and a major railway junction. In addition, access to the ground was restricted to a narrow side street known locally as "The Narrows". The poor access, and poor scope for evacuation in the case of emergency, meant that the capacity of the ground was cut to 8,000 by the early 1990s following stricter ground safety regulations that followed the Valley Parade fire of 1985 and the Taylor Report which followed the Hillsborough disaster of 1989.

In addition, the ground's proximity to the river meant the ground often flooded during the autumn and winter months, leading to matches being postponed. Flooding also caused damage to offices and changing rooms.

Shrewsbury Town had been considering relocation since 1986, when plans were drawn up for a new stadium to the north of the town and Sainsbury's lined up to build a supermarket on the site of the old stadium. However, with Shrewsbury relegated from the Second Division in 1989 and Sainsbury's developing elsewhere in the town, the plans were abandoned. In the 1990s, plans were made to redevelop Gay Meadow; however, due to the poor access, capacity could rise to no more than 10,000.

In 1999, recently elected chairman Roland Wycherley released plans for a new stadium, provisionally titled the New Meadow, a 10,000 all-seater stadium on the southern outskirts of the town between the Meole Brace and Sutton Farm districts.

Amongst other things, opposition from residents delayed the planning and building process until 2006, with the ground not being completed until July 2007. The New Meadow has a 10,000 all-seated capacity, with the scope to expand to beyond 40,000. In addition, the ground has far better road links, more car parking, and, being well away from the river, is unlikely to suffer from flooding.

== End of Gay Meadow ==
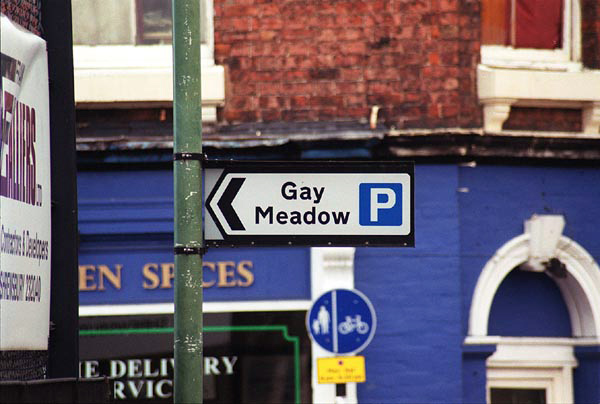
Road sign to Gay Meadow in Shrewsbury, England

To fund the move, the Gay Meadow site was sold to property developers. The final season at Gay Meadow was 2006–07.

Gay Meadow's final FA Cup tie was a goalless draw against Hereford United on 11 November 2006 in the first round (Shrewsbury lost the replay at Edgar Street).

The last team to win a professional match at Gay Meadow were Shrewsbury's biggest rivals Wrexham, who won 1–0 at the penultimate league game at the ground on 24 April 2007.

The final League game played at Gay Meadow was against Grimsby Town on 5 May 2007, a 2–2 draw, with Grimsby equalising in the final minute. To commemorate the day, a parade of former Shrewsbury Town greats was organised, with commemorative T-shirts being handed out to fans free of charge with donations for local charities instead. Defender Kelvin Langmead took the honour of being the final Shrewsbury Town goal scorer at the ground, although Grimsby's Nick Fenton scored the ground's final professional goal.

The final senior competitive match held at Gay Meadow was against Milton Keynes Dons on 14 May 2007, the first leg of the League 2 Play-offs. The game finished 0-0.

Before demolition, fans were given the opportunity to play on the pitch in specially arranged friendly matches, and an auction was staged at the ground on 17 June 2007, where over 200 items were auctioned. In addition, 500 unsold seats were purchased by League of Wales side Caernarfon Town, to be used in the redevelopment of a stand at their ground, the Oval.

The final football match to be staged at Gay Meadow was the club's annual friendly fixture between Shrewsbury's "Away Supporters" team and the Shrewsbury Town backroom staff on Friday 22 June. Alan Roberts, the club's police liaison officer, scored the only goal of the game, and thus the last goal at the ground.

In September 2007 demolition of the stadium began, and by October 2007 the ground was reduced to rubble. The site was earmarked for residential building, with 150 flats scheduled to be built on the site. In 2009, building started on a number of luxury flats and it was completed in 2014.

With the ground almost completely demolished, a charity zip-wire event was held on 14 October 2007. Over 100 townspeople "flew" from the St. Mary's area of the town centre, over the River Severn to land on the Gay Meadow pitch, emulating Robert Cadman's attempt in 1739. In addition, sections of the Gay Meadow turf were sold for a small fee for Severn Hospice, the organising charity. This was the final public event to take place at Gay Meadow before the redevelopment of the site.
