= List of Bolton Wanderers F.C. managers =

The following is a list of managers or head coaches of Bolton Wanderers Football Club and their major honours from the beginning of the club's official managerial records in 1885 to the present day. As of the 2024–25 season, Bolton Wanderers have had 29 full-time managers with one, Nat Lofthouse, being in charge on two occasions.

The most successful person to manage Bolton Wanderers, to date, is Charles Foweraker, who won three FA Cups in his 25-year reign as manager. He is also the club's longest-serving manager. Their current Head Coach is Steven Schumacher, having taken charge on 30 January 2025.

== Statistics ==
Information correct as of matches played up to 24 May 2026. Only competitive matches are counted.

Name	Nationality	From	To	P	W	D	L	Win% (Note: Win% is rounded to two decimal places)	Honours	Minor Honours (First Team only)	Notes
Tom Rawthorne	England	1 August 1874	31 May 1885	13	6	4	3	46.15			(Note: Secretary of the committee that chose the team)
John Bentley	England	1 August 1885	31 May 1886	3	1	1	1	33.33		1 Lancashire Senior Cup: 1886	
William Struthers	Scotland	1 August 1886	31 May 1887	3	2	0	1	66.67			
Fitzroy Norris	England	1 August 1887	1 December 1887	3	0	2	1	0.00			
John Bentley	England	1 December 1887	31 May 1895	200	89	25	86	44.50		1 Lancashire Senior Cup: 1891	
Harry Downs	England	1 August 1895	31 May 1896	35	19	6	10	54.29			
Frank Brettell	England	1 August 1896	31 May 1898	68	26	13	29	38.24			
John Somerville	Scotland	1 August 1898	1 January 1910	438	192	77	169	43.84	Football League Second Division Champions 1908–09		
Will Settle	England	1 January 1910	31 May 1915	224	97	46	81	43.30		1 Lancashire Senior Cup: 1912	
Tom Mather	England	1 August 1915	31 May 1919	0	0	0	0	—			
Charles Foweraker	England	1 July 1919	1 August 1944	912	373	231	308	40.90	3 FA Cups: 1923, 1926, 1929	6 Lancashire Senior Cups: 1922, 1925, 1927, 1932, 1934, 1939 (shared with Preston North End)	
Walter Rowley	England	1 August 1944	1 October 1950	197	64	44	89	32.49		1 Football League War Cup: 1945; 1 Lancashire Senior Cup: 1948	
Bill Ridding	England	1 October 1950	1 August 1968	767	290	184	293	37.81	1 FA Cup: 1958, 1 FA Charity Shield: 1958		
Nat Lofthouse	England	1 December 1968	1 November 1970	81	22	23	36	27.16			
Jimmy McIlroy	Northern Ireland	1 November 1970	19 November 1970	2	0	0	2	0.00			
Jimmy Meadows	England	13 January 1971	30 April 1971	16	1	4	11	6.25			
Nat Lofthouse	England	1 May 1971	1 August 1971	0	0	0	0	—			
Jimmy Armfield	England	1 August 1971	4 October 1974	180	80	47	53	44.44	Football League Third Division Champions 1972–73		
Ian Greaves	England	7 October 1974	28 January 1980	230	90	66	74	39.13	Football League Second Division Champions 1977–78		
Stan Anderson	England	28 January 1980	31 May 1981	62	18	17	27	29.03			
George Mulhall	Scotland	1 June 1981	1 June 1982	42	13	7	22	30.95			
John McGovern	Scotland	1 June 1982	7 January 1985	118	37	26	55	31.36			
Charlie Wright	Scotland	7 February 1985	6 December 1985	44	11	8	25	25.00			
Phil Neal	England	18 December 1985	8 May 1992	351	132	103	116	37.61	1 Football League Trophy: 1989	2 Lancashire Senior Cups: 1989, 1991	
Bruce Rioch	Scotland	29 May 1992	8 June 1995	172	83	42	47	48.26			
Roy McFarland	England	20 June 1995	2 January 1996	28	5	7	16	17.86			(Note: Colin Todd was appointed as a de facto co-manager with McFarland but McFarland was always treated as the senior partner by the press.)
Colin Todd	England	2 January 1996	22 September 1999	183	79	53	51	43.17	Football League First Division Champions 1996–97		
Sam Allardyce	England	19 October 1999	29 April 2007	371	153	104	114	41.24		1 FA Premier League Asia Trophy: 2005	
Sammy Lee	England	30 April 2007	7 October 2007	14	3	4	7	21.43			
Gary Megson	England	25 October 2007	30 December 2009	99	27	27	45	27.27			
Owen Coyle	Republic of Ireland	8 January 2010	9 October 2012	126	42	24	60	33.33			
Dougie Freedman	Scotland	23 October 2012	3 October 2014	101	34	33	34	33.66			
Neil Lennon	Northern Ireland	12 October 2014	15 March 2016	80	18	26	36	22.50			
Phil Parkinson	England	10 June 2016	21 August 2019	157	49	34	74	31.21			
Keith Hill	England	31 August 2019	30 June 2020	33	6	11	16	18.18			
Ian Evatt	England	1 July 2020	22 January 2025	261	130	58	73	49.81	1 EFL Trophy: 2023		
Steven Schumacher	England	30 January 2025		76	34	22	20	44.74			
