= Samuel Browne (divine) =

Samuel Browne (1575?–buried 6 May 1632) was a British divine.

== Life ==
Browne was born at or near Shrewsbury, Shropshire. He was a clerk of All Souls College, Oxford, in 1594, at the age of nineteen, graduated B.A. on 3 November 1601, and M.A. on 3 July 1605, and took orders.

In 1618, he was appointed minister of St. Mary's Church, Shrewsbury, "where he was much resorted to by precise people for his edifying and frequent preaching" (Anthony Wood). In spite, however, of this notice of his ministry in the Athenae Oxonienses, Browne can scarcely have been a puritan, for in the curious little book entitled 'The Looking-glasse of Schisme, wherein by a briefe and true Narration of the execrable Murders done by Enoch ap Evan, a downe-right Nonconformist . . . the Disobedience of that Sect . . . is plainly set forth' (1635), the author, Peter Studley, minister of St Chad's Church, Shrewsbury speaks of him with great respect, and says that during the thirteen years of his ministry he was 'rudely and unchristianly handled' by the disloyal and schismatical party in the town, and that finally, 'by an invective and bitter Libel, consisting of fourteene leaves in quarto cast into his garden, they disquieted nis painefull and peaceable soule, and shortened the date of his troublesome pilgrimage.'

Browne died in 1632, and was buried at St. Mary's on 6 May.

== Works ==
- The Sum of Christian Religion by way of Catechism, 1630, 1037, 8vo,
- Certain Prayers
