= Billy Scarratt =

English footballer

Billy Scarratt (1878–1958) was an English footballer who gained recognition as one of the first star names at Shrewsbury Town.

Scarratt joined Shrewsbury Town from his hometown team Wellington Town, and was to play for Shrewsbury for eight seasons prior to World War I.

Scarratt is credited as being the first ever goalscorer at Shrewsbury's former Gay Meadow home, scoring an own goal in the first ever known game, a practice match between the 'Reds' and the 'Whites' on 20 August 1910. He made amends for this shortly after on 10 September, in Shrewsbury Town's first match at Gay Meadow, versus Wolverhampton Wanderers Reserves. Whilst Shrewsbury lost 2–1, Scarratt scored in the right end and became the first Shrewsbury Town player to score at Gay Meadow.

During his eight-season spell at Gay Meadow, Scarratt played in every position, including goalkeeper. His Shrewsbury career was ended by World War I, when he served in the King's Shropshire Light Infantry. Having survived the war, he is not believed to have returned to football, instead he emigrated to New York City to find work as a builder. He returned to Shropshire in 1930 (possibly as a result of the Great Depression) and settled in his hometown of Wellington before dying in 1958, aged 80.
