= Will Settle =

English football manager

Will Settle was an English football manager, serving in that capacity for five years, from 1910 to 1915, at Bolton Wanderers.

He was initially a director at the club, taking over his father's position on the board in 1899, remaining so until he replaced John Somerville in January 1910. Unable to prevent relegation to the Second Division that season, he immediately gained promotion at the first time of asking. During his time at the club he signed players like Ted Vizard and Alf Bentley and his sale of Tom Barber ensured the club could pay for the roof of the Great Lever Stand at Burnden Park. He left the club during World War I.
