= John Somerville (Scottish footballer) =

Scottish footballer and manager

Personal information
- Full name: John Somerville
- Date of birth: 1868
- Place of birth: Ayr, Scotland
- Date of death: 1917 (aged 48–49)
- Position: Right back

Senior career*
Years	Team	Apps	(Gls)
- Ayr
1890–1901	Bolton Wanderers	265	(2)

Managerial career
- 1898–1910: Bolton Wanderers
- * Club domestic league appearances and goals

John Somerville (1868–1917) was a Scottish footballer and manager, serving in both capacities, as well as that of secretary, for Bolton Wanderers.

Joining the club in 1890 from Ayr, he went on to make 293 appearances for the club, playing on the losing side in the 1894 FA Cup Final. When Frank Brettell left the club in 1898, Somerville was made secretary-player, on retirement becoming secretary-manager (leading the team to the 1904 FA Cup Final, again resulting in defeat) and eventually becoming the club's first full-time manager in 1908. Under Somerville, the club were promoted to the First Division on three occasions and relegated four times. During the season that Bolton were relegated the fourth time (1909–10), Somerville stepped down, being replaced by Will Settle. He remained as secretary for the rest of the season before leaving the club. He later became a Football League linesman.
