= Robert Cadman =

English steeplejack and stuntman (1711–1739)

Robert Cadman or Robert Kidman (1711 – 2 February 1739) was an 18th-century steeplejack and ropeslider who between 1732 and 1739 performed feats of daring, ultimately by sliding or flying down a rope from St Mary's Church, Shrewsbury to the Gay Meadow, across the River Severn.

He had previously performed the stunt in other locations. For example, an 1828 history of Dover (Batcheller) records that he "amused the people of Dover, by flying across the harbour, from the highest point of the cliff, towards the lower extremity of Snargate-street .....Thousands were assembled from all parts to view this novel sight." A History of Lincoln (1815) notes that, in this period, he went from a cathedral tower "to the castle hill near the Black Boy Inn"" and another descent from 'Newark spire' in Nottinghamshire.

Cadman walked some 250 metres up the rope that connected the 68-metre-high spire of St Mary's Church with an anchor in the ground in Gay Meadow, Shrewsbury. He performed trick while climbing up the rope across the River Severn. When at the top, near the pinnacle of the spire, he donned a wooden breastplate with a central groove and hurtled to earth along the rope.

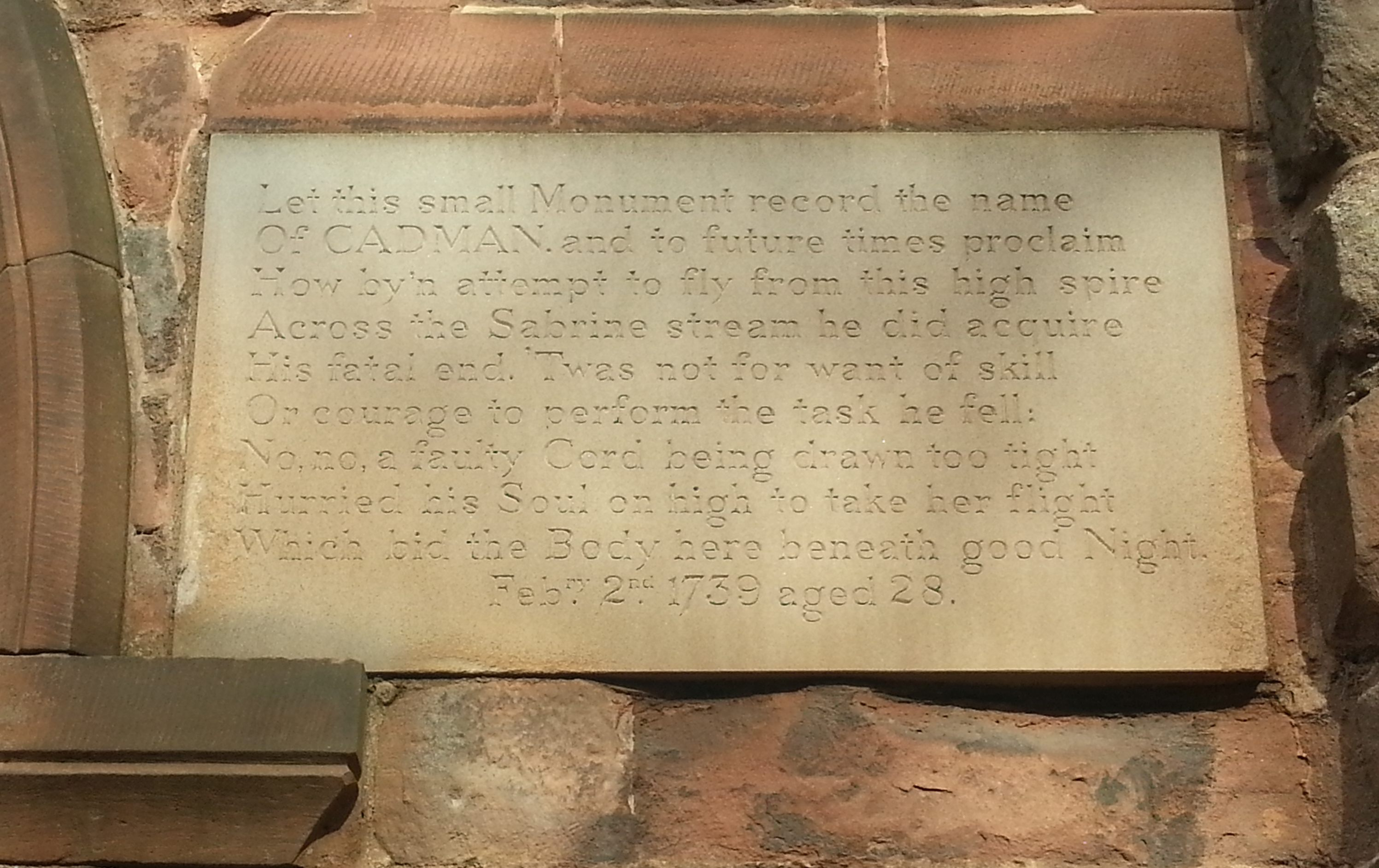
Plaque on the tower of St Mary's Church, Shrewsbury

On 2 February 1739 he fell to his death when the rope broke. He was buried at St Mary's Church, where a commemorative plaque in his memory may still be found by the west entrance. It reads:

Let this small Monument record the name
of Cadman, and to future time proclaim
How by'n attempt to fly from this high spire
across the Sabrine stream he did acquire
His fatal end. 'Twas not for want of skill
Or courage to perform the task he fell,
No, no, a faulty Cord being drawn too tight
Hurried his Soul on high to take her flight
Which bid the Body here beneath good Night
Feb.^{ry} 2nd 1739 aged 28
