= Tom Clough (artist) =

English painter

Thomas or Tom Clough (12 July 1867 – 3 February 1943) was an English landscape artist.

He was born in Bolton, Lancashire, the son of a weaver and initially worked there as a lithographic printer in a law printing office. After a short spell as an insurance agent he ran a small drapery business in the town. He took up landscape painting in the 1890s and came to notice when his painting "Gorsey Heath" was accepted by the Royal Academy in 1893. He moved in 1894 to live at Glan Conway in North Wales where he painted many of his best known works which were exhibited at the leading galleries, including 14 paintings at the Royal Academy. He also painted in Cornwall, Devon, Northern France and Italy.

He died in Llandudno, North Wales in 1943. He had married Caroline Green of Bolton and had a daughter and a son.
