= Adam James Syddall =

English cricketer

Adam Syddall (born 10 June 1980) is a cricketer born in Bolton, Lancashire. He has represented Lancashire County Cricket Club 2nd XI from 1999 to 2000 and a number of other first-class county 2nd XI's including Hampshire, Worcestershire, Glamorgan, Northamptonshire and Leicestershire. He played for Cambridgeshire County Cricket Club in 2005 and 2006 winning their player of the season award in 2006.

In 2007 he moved to Cheshire County Cricket Club and won the Western Division title with Cheshire in 2007, 2009 and 2013. He went on to win two minor county championship titles with Cheshire in 2007 and 2013. To date he holds the record for the most number of one-day wickets for Cheshire County Cricket Club. Adam was capped by Cheshire County Cricket Club in 2008 and captained the club in the Championship in 2012.

He moved to his third minor county team Cumberland County Cricket Club in 2016 and captained the county during their one-day campaign in 2018.

Adam Syddall has represented the Minor Counties Cricket Association in a number of fixtures and was a member of the MCCA/Unicorns squad playing in the First Class Counties 2nd XI Trophy from 2007 to 2016.

Adam Syddall was part of the last ever 'A' Tour sent by Marylebone Cricket Club to East Africa under the captaincy of England player Jamie Dalrymple in 2008 and has represented MCC in over 100 fixtures to date.
