= Steeplejack =

Construction worker specialising in the exteriors of tall buildings

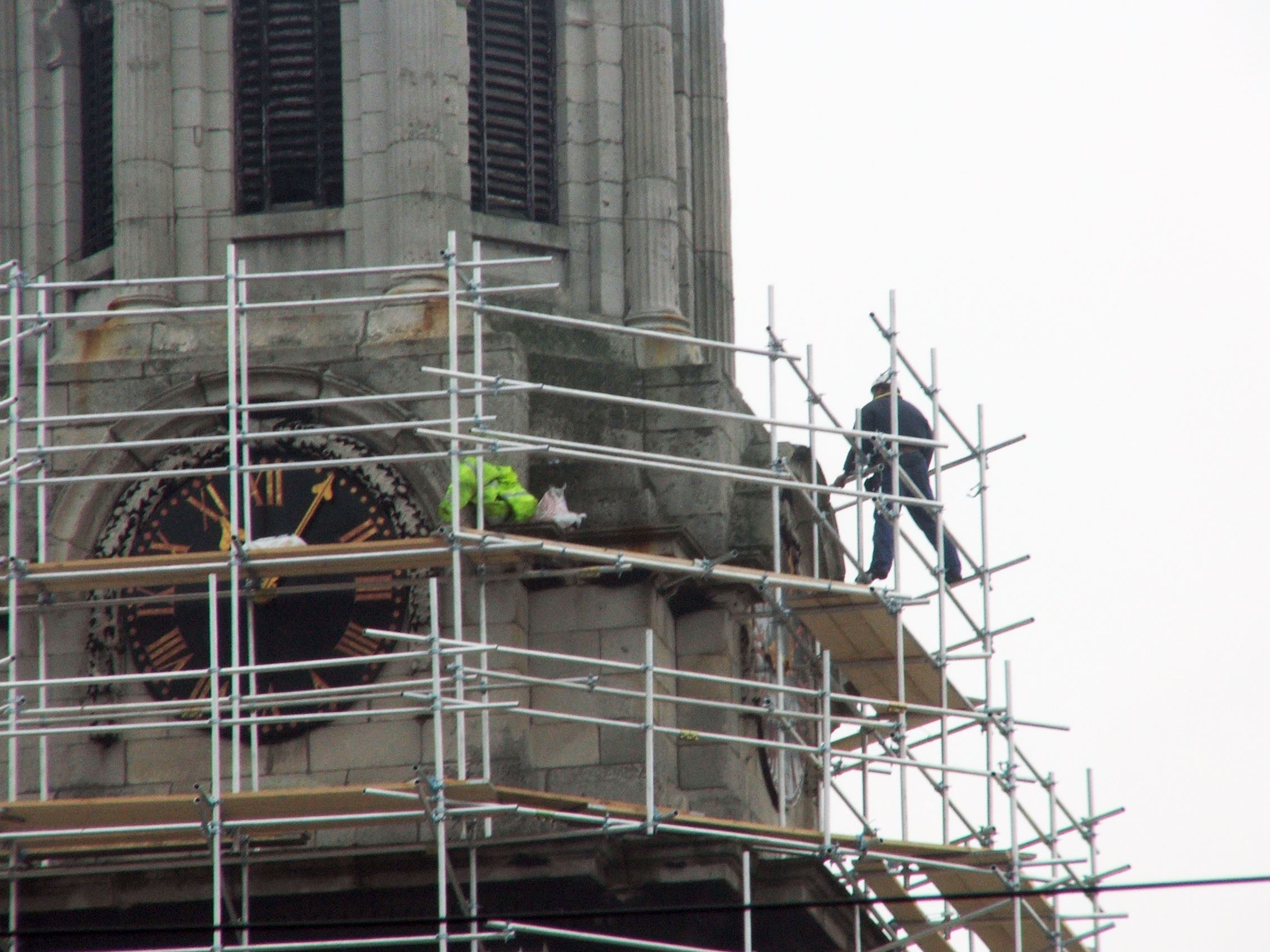
A steeplejack at work

A steeplejack is a craftsman who scales tall buildings and structures to carry out repairs or maintenance. They are sometimes also involved in new construction, as well as demolition.

== Processes and techniques ==
Steeplejacks anchor long modular ladders on church spires and steeples, industrial chimneys, cooling towers, bell towers, clock towers, skyscrapers, or any other tall structure. In the UK, modern steeplejacks use a belay rope fall-arrest system (similar to the method used by rock climbers) attached to the ladders as they are erected to eliminate solo climbing and greatly reduce the risk of falls from height.

Once ladders have been erected, the next stage is usually to suspend a bosun's chair (a strong wooden plank on which the steeplejack can sit, pull themselves upwards or lower themselves downwards, or sit in a stationary position), but abseiling (UK) or rappelling (US) equipment is replacing the bosun's chair on many operations because of its lighter weight.

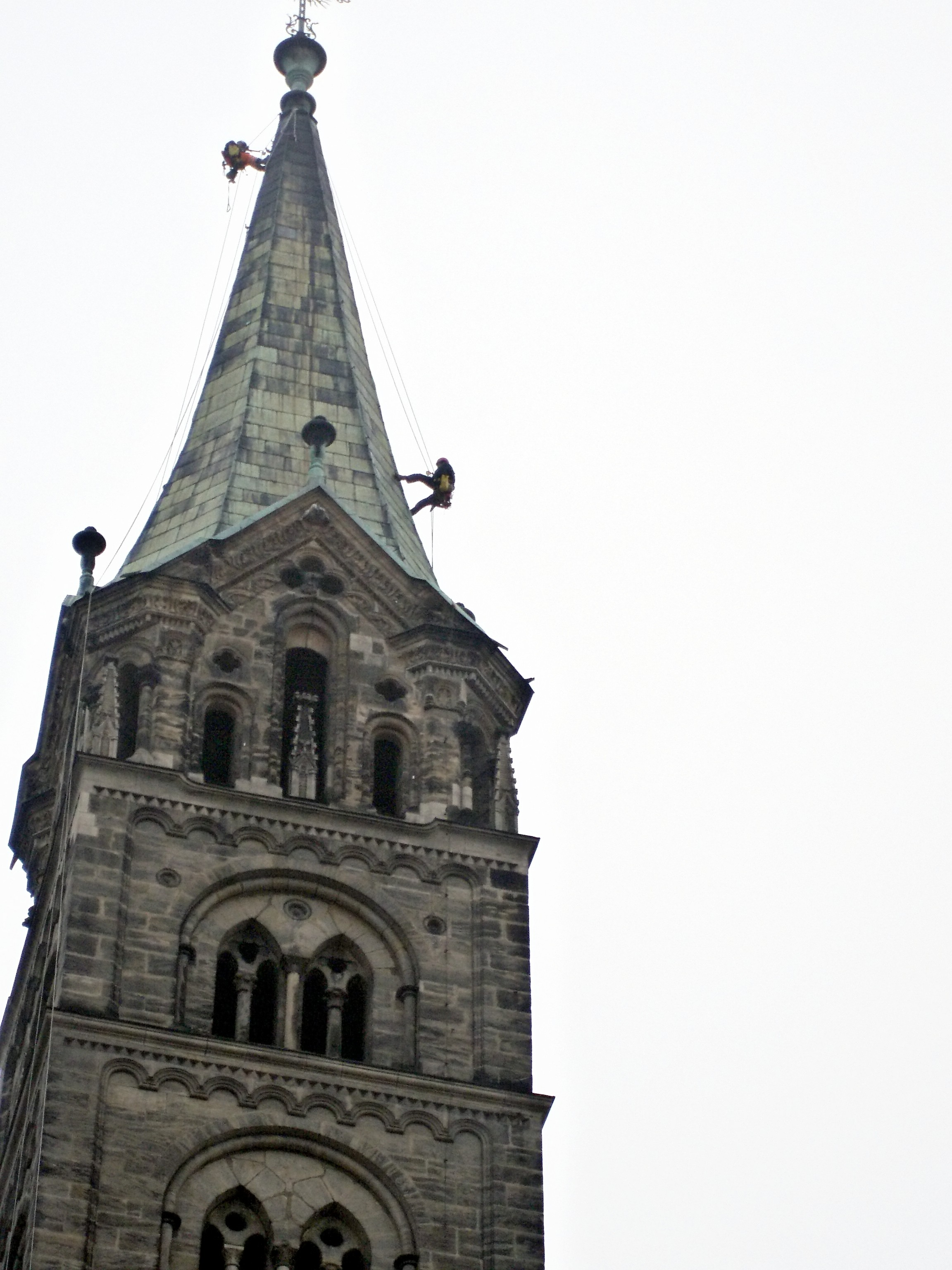
Steeplejacks abseiling on one of the towers of Bamberg Cathedral

Once this has been done it is possible to use this access to begin building scaffolding to carry out any repairs which may be required. This is done by fixing anchors into the wall (whether concrete, stone, or brick) and "kicking" the scaffolding off from there.

It is also possible to carry out repairs from "suspended access cradles". These are the same type of rig window cleaners use on skyscrapers. The cradle is suspended from four wires. Two of these run through an electric motor which can "climb" or "descend" the wire, and the other two run freely through a box which allows the cradle to travel upwards with no obstruction, but will stop it instantly if it starts to fall. These "suspended access cradles" are popularly called "swing stages" by their crews.

== Duties ==
Steeplejacks are called upon to repair or replace masonry (brick, stone or concrete), carry out general carpentry or painting or roof repair, remove and clean and repair windows, as well as sandblasting and other masonry cleaning tasks.

== History ==
The profession has existed since at least the 11th century–when the Bayeux Tapestry, which depicts a steeplejack, is thought to have been created.

== Notable people ==
- Albert Ball
- Robert Cadman
- Fred Dibnah
- Israel Nathan Herstein
- Alvin "Shipwreck" Kelly
- Rodman Law

== Gallery ==
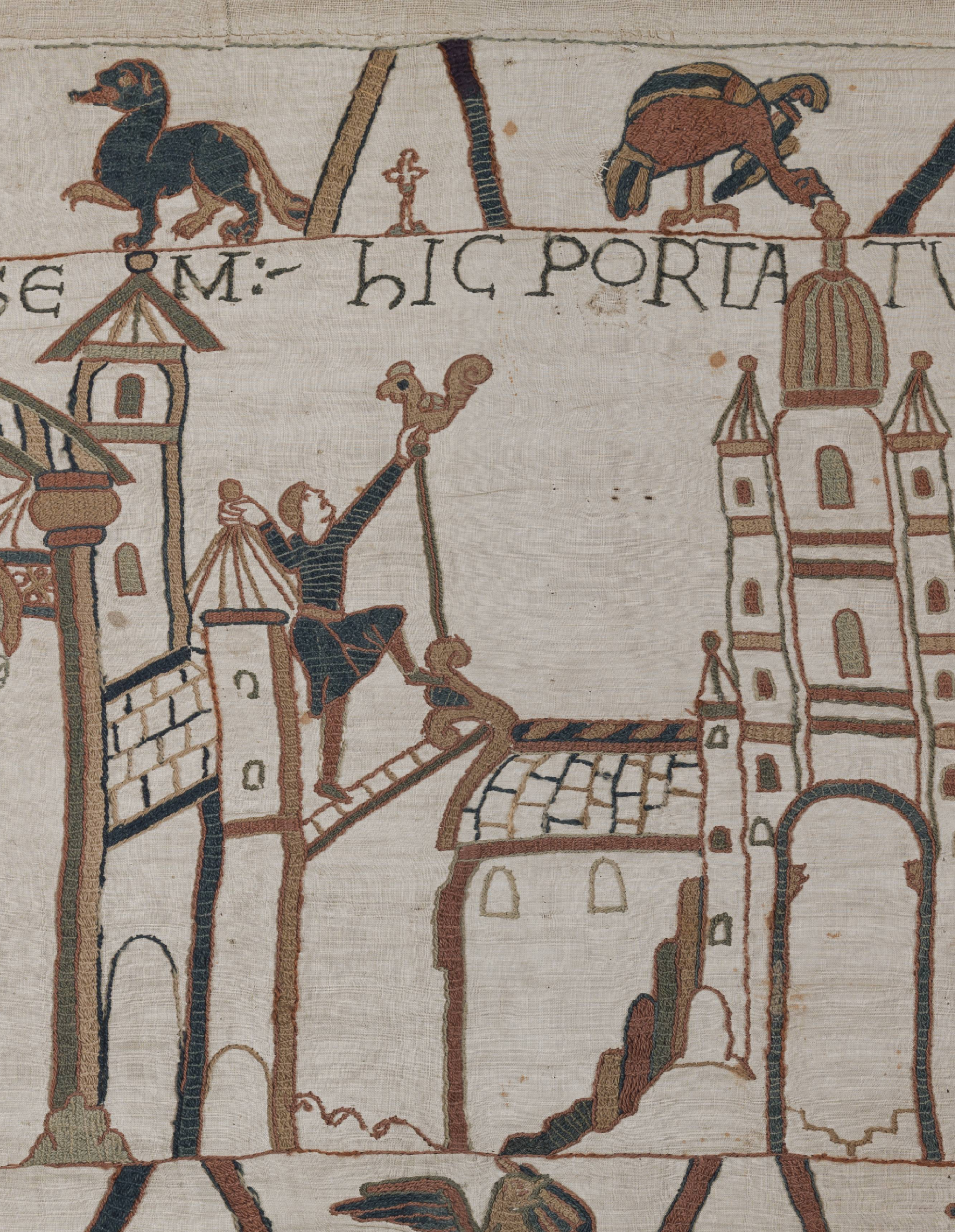
Scene 26 of the Bayeux Tapestry (detail)

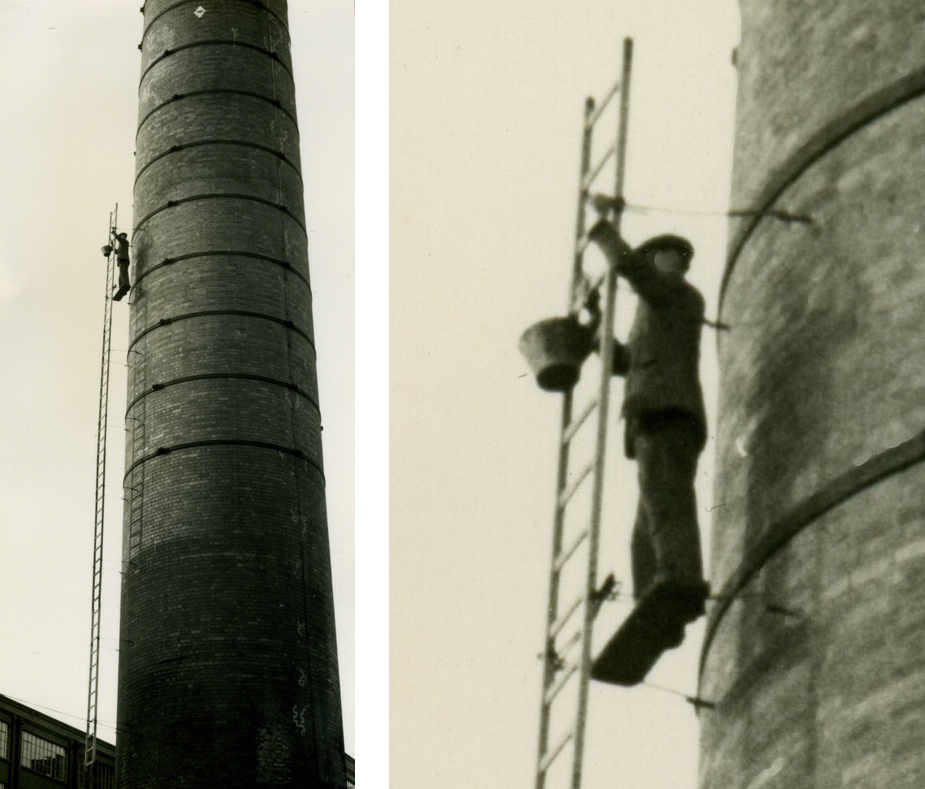
Laddering a chimney in central Bristol, England, taken around 1960. The enlargement shows the few safety precautions.

Raising the steeple on the Hoboken Ferry Terminal Clock Tower in New Jersey

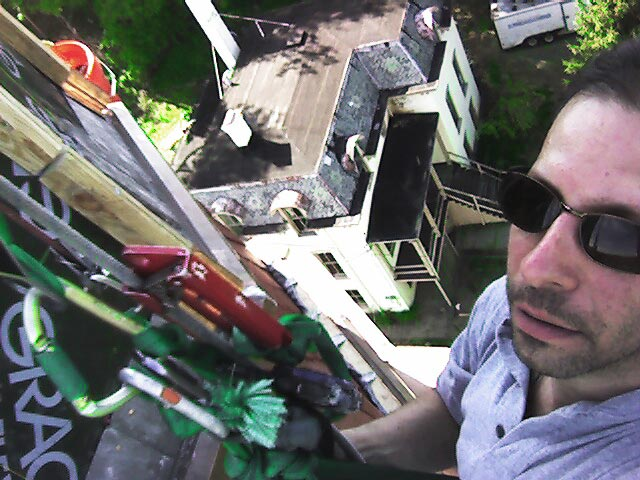
Steeplejack with climbing rope and ascenders replacing a 200 foot steeple in The Rondout section of Kingston, New York

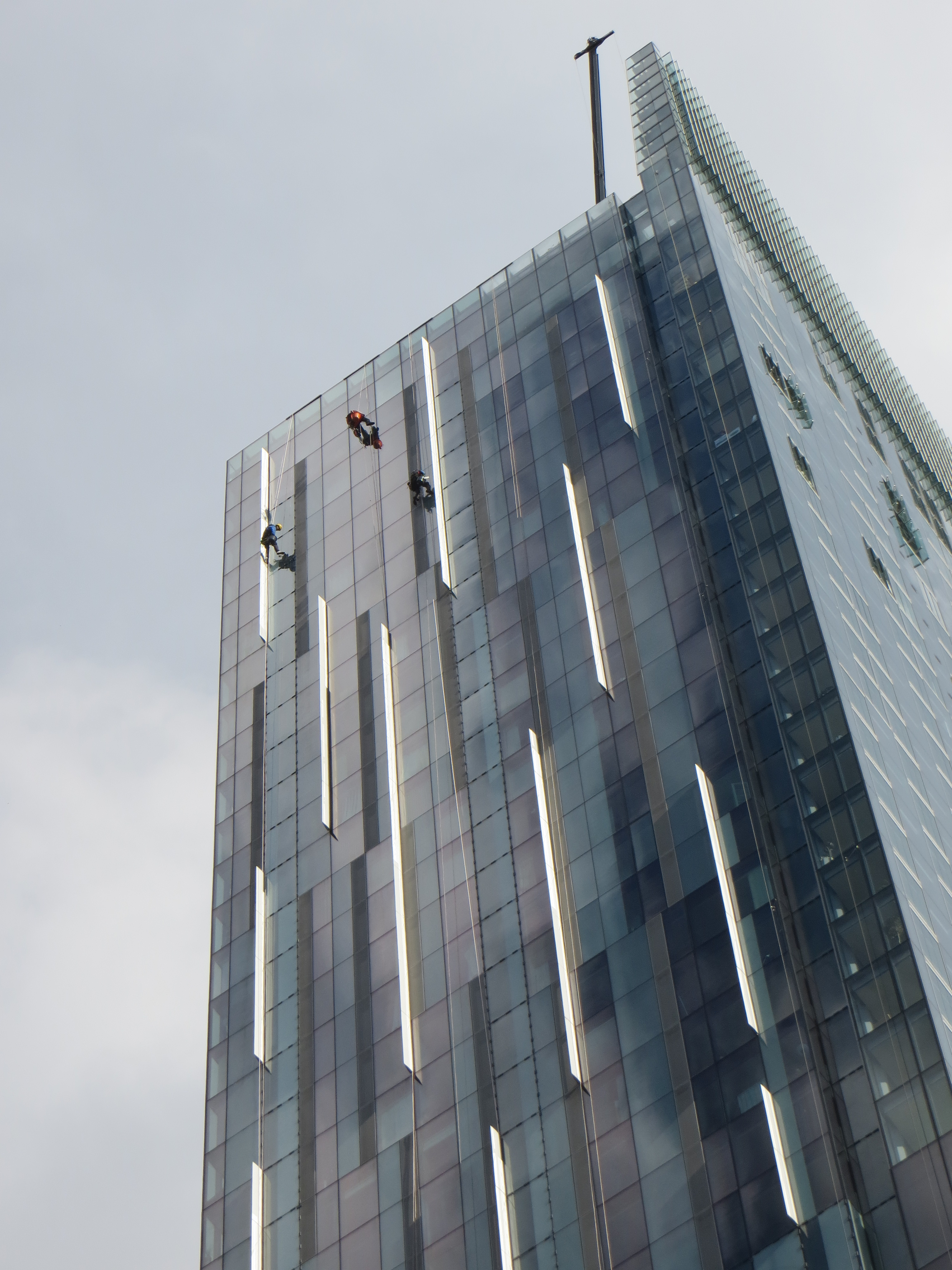
Steeplejacks on a modern skyscraper

== See also ==
- Tobishoku – Japanese scaffolding men
