= St Mary's Church, Shrewsbury =

Coordinates: 52.7087°N 2.7513°W

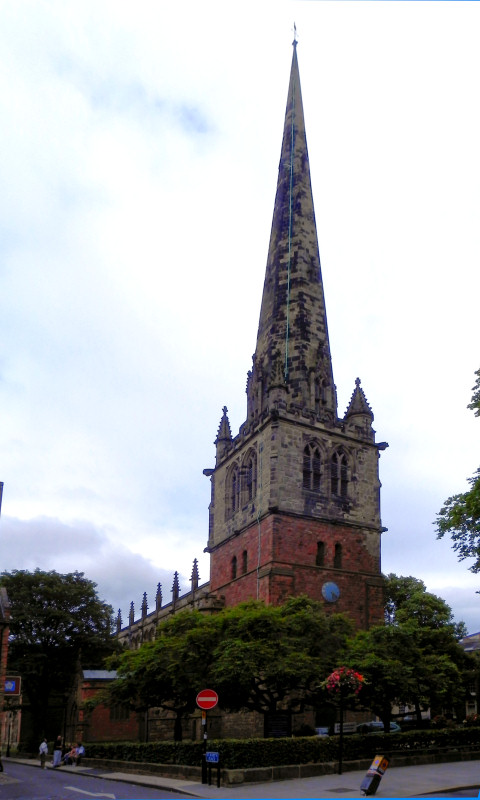
- St Mary's Church, Shrewsbury, from the northwest

- Location in Shropshire
- OS grid reference: SJ 493,126
- Location: St Mary's Place, Shrewsbury, Shropshire
- Country: England
- Denomination: Church of England
- Website: Conservation Trust

History
- Founder: King Edgar (?)

Architecture
- Functional status: Redundant
- Heritage designation: Grade I
- Designated: 10 January 1953
- Architectural type: Church
- Style: Norman, Gothic

Specifications
- Materials: Sandstone

St Mary's Church is a redundant Anglican church in St Mary's Place, Shrewsbury, Shropshire, England. It is recorded in the National Heritage List for England as a designated Grade I listed building, and is under the care of the Churches Conservation Trust, the Trust designated St Mary's as its first Conservation Church in 2015. It is the largest church in Shrewsbury. Clifton-Taylor includes the church in his list of 'best' English parish churches.

== Collegiate Church ==
St Mary's originated as a collegiate church (The Collegiate Church and Royal Free Chapel of St Mary the Virgin, a Royal Peculiar). According to tradition it was founded by King Edgar in the 10th century. By at least the 13th century, it was served by a dean and nine canons. Excavations in 1864 revealed the presence of an earlier church with a nave and an apsidal chancel. Building of the present church began in the 12th century, consisting of a nave without aisles, and a cruciform east end. A large west tower was added, and in about the 1170s the transepts were altered to provide altars for the canons. Construction of the aisles followed, first the south aisle with a porch. Work on the north aisle continued until the 1220s. The crossing was then rebuilt. In the early to mid 13th century the transepts were raised, and the chancel was lengthened and raised. During the 14th century the Trinity Chapel was added to the south of the chancel. In the following century, possibly about 1477 when a bequest was made to the church, further improvements took place, including the construction of a clerestory on the nave and chancel, which replaced the tower at the crossing and the chancel vault. At this time the transept roofs were reduced in height, a large east window was inserted, and larger windows were added to the aisles. It is possible that the spire was added to the west tower at this time.

=== Deans of St Mary's College, Shrewsbury ===
- Richard c. 1180s
- Robert of Shrewsbury c. 1186–7 – c. 1200
- William Lestrange
- Henry de Loundres 1203–1226
- Walter of Kirkham 1226
- Stephen de Lucy 1229
- William de Houton 1232 – c. 1250
- William of London 1262
- Simon of Wycombe 1262–1272
- John le Faukener 1272
- William of Dover until 1282
- Nicholas of Arras 1282 – c. 1286
- John de Witham ca. 1291–1300
- John of Kenley 1300 – c. 1305
- Peter de Shendon 1305–1321
- Robert of Hampton 1321–1327
- Nicholas of Ludlow 1327–1341
- Thomas de Baddeby 1341–1381
- Richard Bromley 1381 – c. 1402
- Thomas Standon 1402
- Hugh Holbache 1407 – c. 1416
- Thomas Rodbourne 1418–1424
- John Shipton 1424–1444
- John Burdett 1444–1449
- John Launcell 1449
- John Crecy 1457–1471
- John Blackwin 1471–1472
- John Whitmore 1472
- Robert Reyfield 1498
- Adam Grafton c. 1509 – 1513
- Edward Higgins 1513
- Richard Twyford until 1523
- William Vaughan 1523–1540
- Thomas Lloyd 1540
- William Cureton c. 1548 – 1549

== Parish Church ==
The church escaped any significant damage during the suppression of the college in 1548, or during the Civil War.

The first major restoration was carried out by Thomas Telford in 1788. The east window was enlarged in 1858 by S. Pountney Smith, who also reconstructed some of the roofs between 1864 and 1870. In 1884 Paley and Austin added a vestry to the north of the chancel. Work was performed on the chancel in 1889–92 by A. E. Lloyd Oswell. The top fell from the spire in 1894, causing much damage to the clerestory, and this was repaired by John Oldrid Scott.

The tower underwent a restoration in 1924–26 by the firm of Lloyd Oswell and Iredale. The church was declared redundant in 1987, and vested in the Churches Conservation Trust.

=== Ministers, ordinaries (officials) of the Royal Peculiar, and vicars of St Mary's, Shrewsbury ===
- Robert Wylton, minister and ordinary, 1576
- Edward Bulkeley, minister and ordinary, 1578
- John Tomkys, minister and ordinary, 1582
- Thomas Laughton, minister and ordinary, 1592
- William Bright, minister and ordinary, 1597
- Samuel Browne, 1618
- James Betton, minister and ordinary, 1632
- Samuel Fisher, Presbyterian minister and ordinary, 1646, ejected during the Interregnum 1650 for refusing the Engagement.

From 1651–1662 no priest.

- Francis Tallents, a presbyterian divine, 1652. Ejected 1662.
- Robert Fowler, minister and ordinary, 1662
- Thomas Dawes, minister and ordinary, 1678
- John Lloyd, minister and ordinary, 1715
- Benjamin Wingfield, minister and ordinary, 1743
- Edward Blakeway, minister and ordinary, 1763
- John Brickdale Blakeway, minister and ordinary, 1794
- Hugh Owen, minister, ordinary, archdeacon of Salop, 1826
- William Gorsuch Rowland, minister, vicar, and ordinary, 1828
- Oliver Hopkins, vicar and ordinary, 1852
- Thomas Bucknall Lloyd, vicar, ordinary, archdeacon of Salop, 1854
- Newdigate Poyntz, vicar, 1889
- William Geoffrey Pennyman, vicar, 1910
- Horace Edward Samuel Sneade Lambart, vicar, archdeacon of Salop, (later Earl of Cavan), 1918
- Cyril Jarman, vicar, 1925
- Ramsay Malcolm Bolton Mackenzie Father Mackenzie, vicar, 1938
- Egerton Walters, vicar, prebendary of Lichfield, 1956
- Horatio Henry Follis, vicar, 1969
- Tom Frank Woolley, vicar, prebendary of Lichfield, 1971
- Bernard Thomas Maddox, vicar, prebendary of Lichfield, proctor in Convocation, 1974-1987

=== Notable Curates ===
- Arthur Winnington-Ingram, curate 1884–1885, later Bishop of London.

== Architecture ==
=== Exterior ===
The plan of the church consists of a four-bay nave, with north and south aisles, and north and south porches, a crossing with north and south transepts, a two-bay chancel with a vestry to the north, the Trinity Chapel to the south, and a west tower. The tower has four stages, the bottom three stages are in red sandstone, and the top stage in white sandstone. The bottom three stages are Norman in style, while the top stage is Perpendicular. In the bottom stage is a west doorway with a round arch of two orders. To the left of the doorway is a re-used Roman stone with a Lewis slot. In the next stage, over the doorway, is a clock face. The third stage contains paired Norman windows, and in the top stage are paired two-light transomed bell openings. The summit of the tower has an embattled pierced parapet, and crocketted pinnacles. There is a stair turret in the northeast corner. The spire is octagonal, and recessed behind the parapet. It carries three tiers of lucarnes. The spire is said to be the third tallest in England.

The windows in the north and south sides of the aisles and clerestory are Perpendicular. In the west wall of the south aisle is a round-headed lancet window, and in the west end of the north aisle is a pointed-headed window. The south porch is built in Grinshill stone. It is in two storeys, the lower storey being built in the 12th century, and the upper storey added in the 14th century. The upper storey has a two-light transomed window. The outer doorway has a round arch and three orders of shafts; the inner doorway also has a round arch, but with one order. There are small windows in the side walls of the porch. The south transept has a small Norman doorway and three lancet windows on the south side, and single lancet windows in the west side. The Trinity Chapel has four large three-light windows on the south, and a seven-light window on the east side. The east window of the chancel has eight lights. Above the north vestry are three stepped lancet windows. To the east of the north transept is a "complex corner" with a variety of windows. The north transept itself has 12th-century pilaster buttresses, a small north doorway, and lancet windows. The north aisle has Perpendicular windows and a porch. Within the porch is another Norman doorway, with one order of shafts.

=== Interior ===
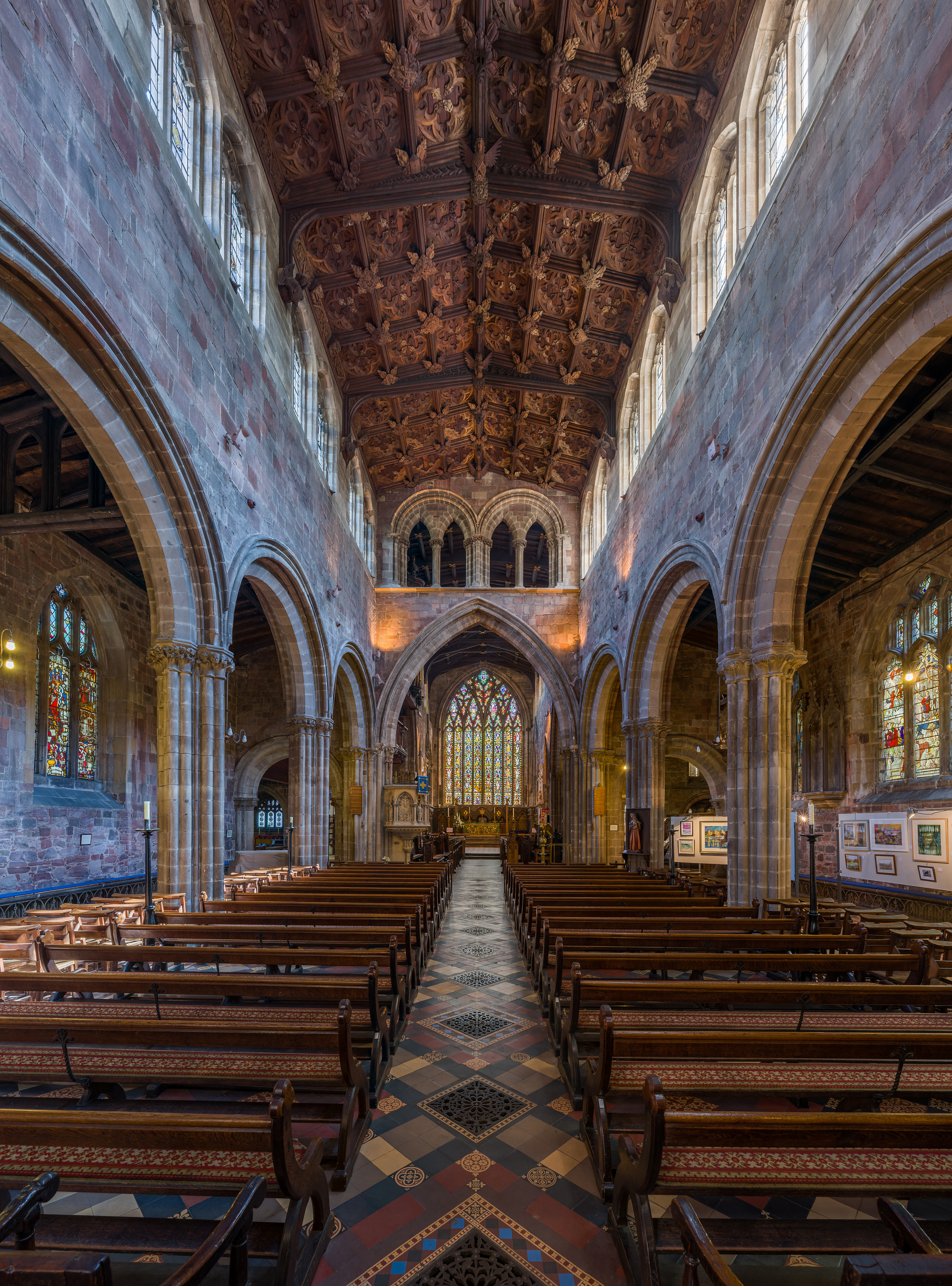
The nave

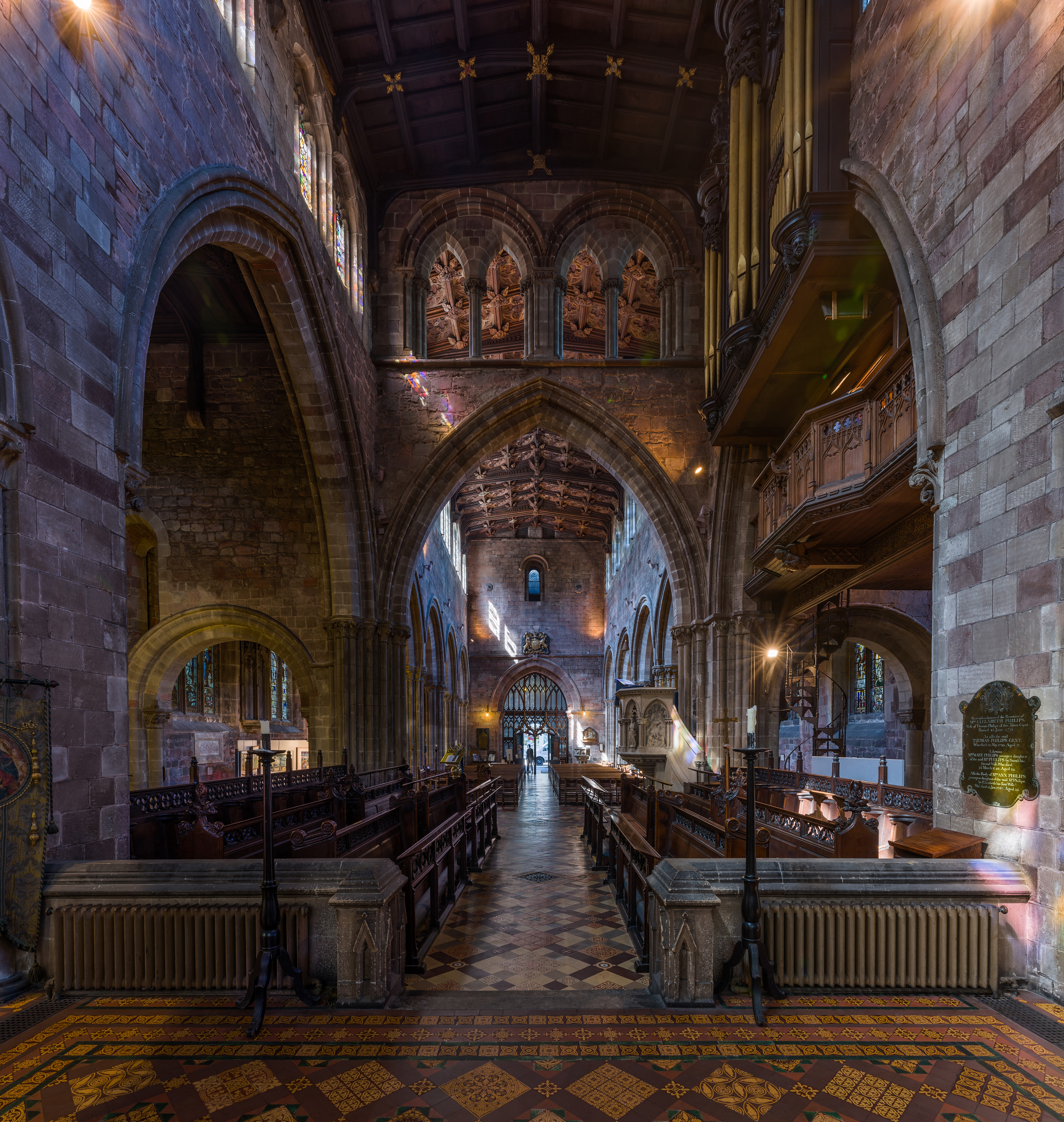
The choir, organ, pulpit and stained glass windows

In the opinion of the architectural historians John Newman and Nikolaus Pevsner, the nave arcades are "the finest piece of architecture in the church", each consisting of four wide bays, with semicircular arches. The oak ceiling of the nave has 15th-century carvings depicting birds, animals and angels. The Trinity Chapel contains a triple sedilia.

==== Furnishings ====
The stone mensa of the medieval high altar was excavated in 1870 and placed below the present altar, which shares the same dimensions. The riddel posts and English Altar were erected during the remodeling of the sanctuary by Sir Charles Archibald Nicholson in 1931. The Altar frontals were worked and embroidered by Beatrix Mary Pennyman, wife of the vicar, during World War I. The octagonal font is Perpendicular, and is carved with arcading and (now headless) angels, The pulpit dates from 1853, it is polygonal, in stone, and designed by S. Pountney Smith. The floor of the church is tiled. The canopied clergy stall of 1897 was designed by C. E. Kempe; it was formerly in the chapel of Shrewsbury School. In 1729 John Harris and John Byfield designed and built a new three-manual organ to replace an earlier organ. This was rebuilt and enlarged in 1847 by Gray and Davison. The present four-manual organ dates from 1912.

==== Stained glass ====
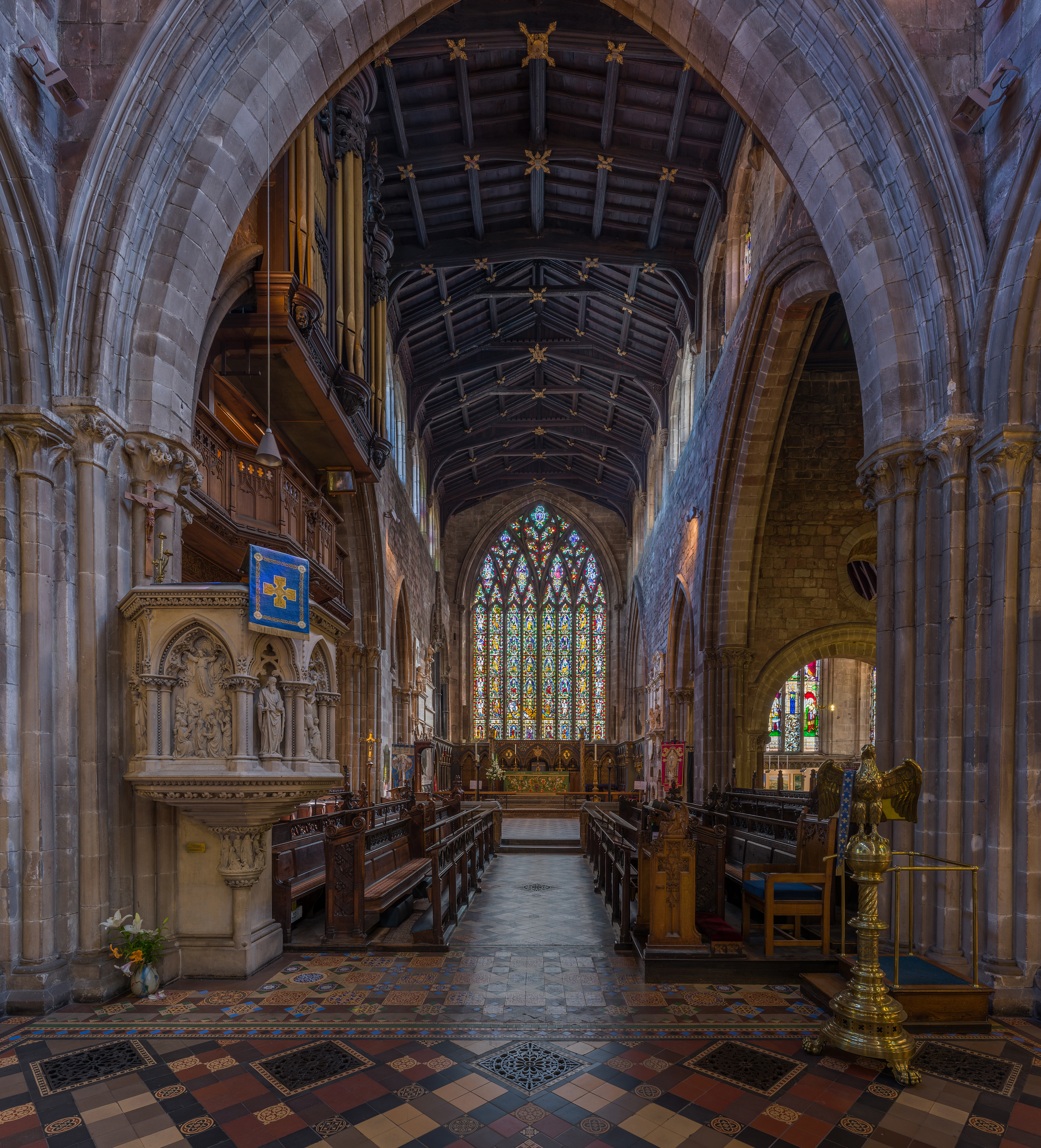
The stained glass behind the altar and choir

The stained glass is of various styles dating from the 14th to the 19th centuries, and was brought to St Mary's from elsewhere, much of it from Europe, in the 18th and 19th centuries. It is said that "no other church in the country has a collection to equal it". The "main treasure" is the east window of the chancel, which contains a depiction of the Jesse Tree. By tradition it was made for the Franciscan church in Shrewsbury, moved to St Chad's Church after the dissolution of the monasteries, and then to St Mary's in 1792. Although it was much restored in 1858 by David and Charles Evans, much of the original glass remains. This glass is dated between 1327 and 1353. Glass in the north windows of the chancel and the central part of the south aisle were made for the Cistercian Altenberg Abbey between 1505 and 1532. They depict scenes from the life of Bernard of Clairvaux, and were bought for St Mary's by Rev W. G. Rowland, the vicar in 1845, at a cost of £425 (£30,000 in 2014). Also in the south aisle are two windows from the church of St Aspern, Cologne. Windows elsewhere consist of part of a collection of 15th-century stained glass bought in 1801 by Sir Brooke Boothby, 6th Baronet at a cost of £200 (£10,000 in 2014). Some of this came from Trier, and the remainder from the Cistercian nunnery of Herkenrode. In the south chapel is glass from the Church of Saint-Jacques in Liège. Elsewhere there is glass dating from the 16th century of Dutch and Flemish origin. Much of the 19th-century glass is by David and Charles Evans. In March 2007 some of the glass was loaned to the Schnütgen Museum in Cologne for their exhibition of 16th-century German stained glass.

==== Monuments ====
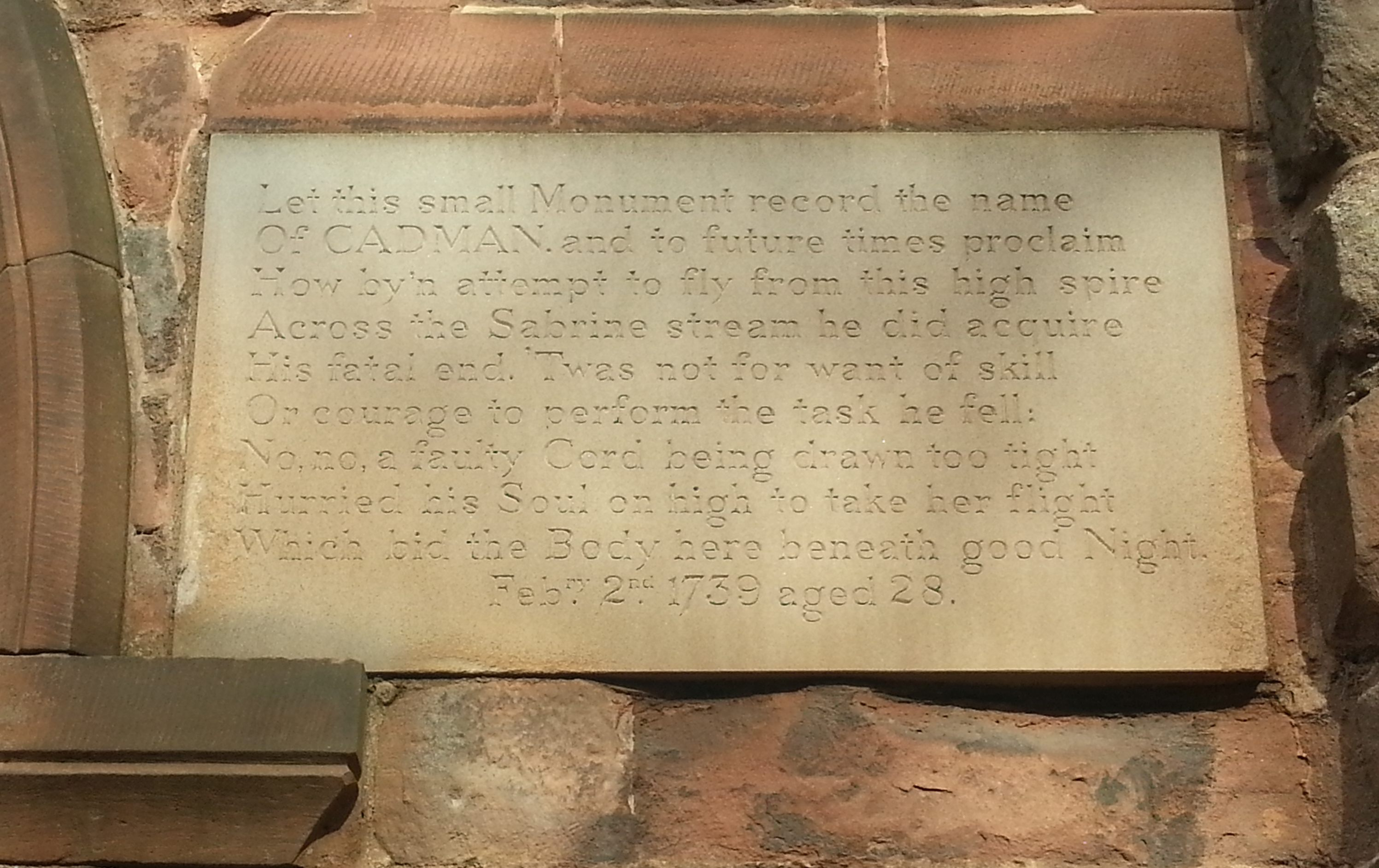
Robert Cadman plaque on the tower

These include an inscription on a plaque on the tower to the memory of Robert Cadman, a tightrope walker who was killed in 1739 when his rope broke. Also in the tower is a recumbent effigy by Richard Westmacott junior depicting Col C. R. Cureton who was killed in India in 1848. Inside the west entrance of the nave is a brass upon marble plaque memorial to men of the 85th Regiment of Foot who died serving in the Afghan War of 1879–80. In the north transept is a wall memorial to Rev John Brickdale Blakeway, vicar of the church, and a local historian, who died in 1826. Also in the north transept are memorials to Nicholas Stafford, who died in 1473, and Admiral Benbow, (sculpted by John Evan Thomas and unveiled 1843) who died of wounds in 1702. The oldest memorial in the church stands in the arch between the chancel and Trinity Chapel. It is a tomb chest with the effigy of a knight, and probably dates from the 1340s. In the south aisle is a grave slab from about 1100 carved with a cross and interlacing. Trinity Chapel contains separate stone tablets to men of the Shropshire Yeomanry who died in the World Wars, besides a roll of honour listing names of those who died in the Second, and a sandstone parish war memorial, headed by a crucifix, to parishioners who died during World War I, with a list of names that include VC recipient W. N. Stone. Katherine Harley, a Suffragist, is also commemorated on the memorial; she was killed at Monastir in 1917, while nursing Serbian refugees. She was the sister of both Field Marshal Sir John French and the Irish Nationalist Charlotte Despard.

== Bells ==
There is a ring of ten bells, eight of which were cast in 1775 by Pack and Chapman at the Whitechapel Bell Foundry, and the other two in by 1911 by John Taylor & Co of Loughborough.

St Mary's bells are inscribed thus; "We were all fixed here by voluntary subscription, in the year 1775." "Happiness to all worthy contributors." "Success to the Worshipful Company of Drapers." "Unanimity and welfare to all the inhabitants of Salop." "Peace and Felicity to this Church and Nation." "Prosperity to St. Mary's Parish." "E. Blakeway, M.A., Minister, J. Watkins, J. Warren, E. Elsmere, H. Kent, Churchwardens." "May all whom I summon to their grave, enjoy everlasting bliss."

To each inscription is added, "Pack & Chapman, London, Fecit 1775". An old bell from Battlefield, cast by Abraham Rudhall of Gloucester, was hung in a turret at the south-west angle of the chancel as a sanctus bell in 1871. The two treble bells have again been re-cast, and now bear the following inscriptions:- "W. G. Pennyman, Vicar. Edw. Burd , Wm. Alltree, A. E. Lloyd Oswell, H. Steward, Churchwardens." "Ring out the darkness of the land, Ring in the Christ that is to be."

== Churchyard ==
Thomas Anderson, a soldier in the Dragoons was executed, as a deserter and Jacobite sympathizer, near the Butchers' Arbour on Kingsland, Shrewsbury on 11 December 1752. He was the last English martyr for the Stuart cause. The Reverend, Benjamin Wingfield, in the face of official hostility, allowed Anderson to be buried in St Mary's Churchyard and read the burial service over the grave. The grave is situated in the south-western quarter of the churchyard.

Samuel Butler, headmaster of Shrewsbury School and later Bishop of Lichfield, is buried in the churchyard where his Latin-inscribed tombstone is still visible.

The churchyard contains the plain sandstone war memorial cross to Shrewsbury townsmen who died in the two World Wars, erected 1920 after World War I by the "National Association of Discharged Sailors and Soldiers (Shrewsbury branch)" (predecessor of the British Legion). On corner posts of the stone kerbs are listed battles or campaigns from World War I in which the men died.

== See also ==
- Grade I listed churches in Shropshire
- List of ecclesiastical works by Paley and Austin
- List of churches preserved by the Churches Conservation Trust in the English Midlands
- Listed buildings in Shrewsbury (southeast central area)

Photographs of St Mary's including many of the fine windows
