= Prophetic conference =

Protestant gathering in England

Prophetic conferences were a manifestation for English-speaking Protestants of the 19th century of the interest in Biblical prophecy and its interpretation. Such conferences have been thought a likely source of some of the analytical terms now deployed in discussing interpretations, such as premillennialism, premillennarian, postmillennialism, postmillennarian and amillennialism, some time ahead of their appearance in the 1840s in print.

== Background ==
The context for the initial prophetic conferences was of multiple British groups with related interests, in the 1820s. The aftermath of the French Revolution was still being felt, and for evangelicals it might suggest a premillennial return of Christ.

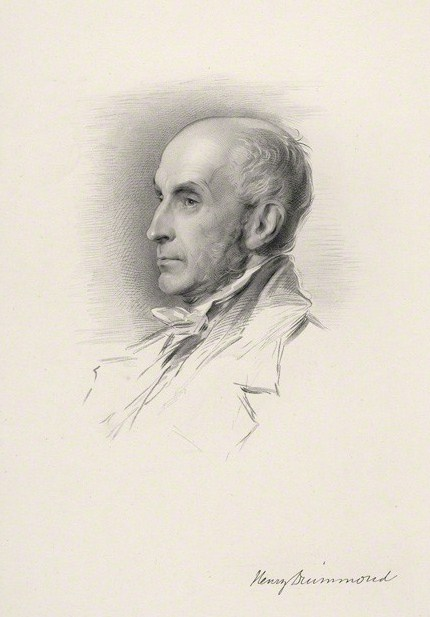
Henry Drummond, 1857 engraving

Edward Irving based his prophetic views in part on a reading of Manuel Lacunza; another possible influence was William Cuninghame of Lainshaw, more particularly in published remarks from 1817. He preached to the Continental Society and London Missionary Society in 1825, making remarks against Catholic Emancipation. He also adopted ideas of James Hatley Frere on prophetic interpretation.

The Society for the Investigation of Prophecy was founded in 1826 by Frere, Irving and Lewis Way. Way was involved with the London Jews' Society, and in 1822 had written as "Basilicus" in its publication The Jewish Expositor on the Second Coming. His view on the personal reign of Christ at Jerusalem was contested by Henry Gauntlett, and a controversy resulted. Samuel Roffey Maitland, author of An Enquiry into the Grounds on which the Prophetic Period of Daniel and St. John has been supposed to consist of 1,260 Years (1826), contended against the prevailing interpretative conventions for prophecy of the 1820s.

The first prophetic conference was in England in 1826, set up by Henry Drummond, who was influenced by Irving and Way. The first national prophetic conference in the USA was held in 1878.

== Albury Conferences (1826–1830) ==
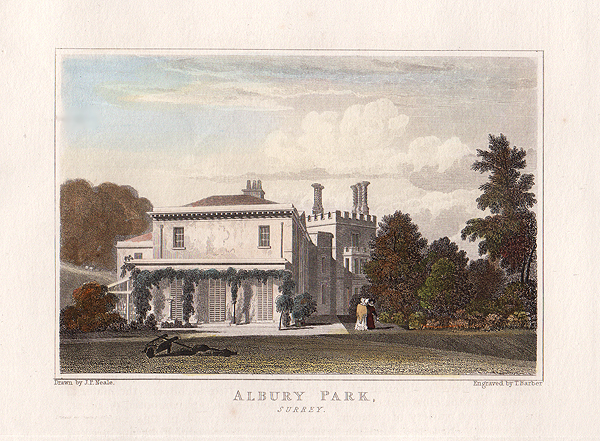
Albury Park, 1831 engraving

Henry Drummond hosted six annual prophetic conferences at Albury Park in Surrey, England. They were chaired by Hugh McNeile, parish priest of Albury. Seven summary points included the Second Advent ahead of the Millennium, and the identification of a 1260-year period preceding the Millennium as running from the reign of Justinian I to the French Revolution.

Transactions of the first three conferences were published in 1828–9 by Drummond, as Dialogues on Prophecy in three volumes. Not a faithful record of what was said, this was Drummond's version, employing pseudonyms for participants, and containing criticism of Irving. Prophetic views of James Hatley Frere were incorporated. Joshua William Brooks claimed to give a key to some of the more significant pseudonyms in his Dictionary of Writers on the Prophecies (1835); it has been said by Oliver that the value of getting behind the pseudonyms may be restricted by the heavy editorial line imposed by Drummond, and Brooks gave the caveat that participants thought themselves misrepresented.

Total participation of around 40 was dominated by Anglican clergy, but other Protestant denominations were represented, and laymen attended. From these meetings there emerged what is now known as the "Albury Circle", of like-minded persons around Drummond. It overlapped notably with the Continental Society, and in its early days with followers of Irving. By the time of the third conference of 1828, which was invitation-only, Drummond was consciously forming a select group.

The views characteristic of the Albury Circle, which was heavily involved in the foundation of the Catholic Apostolic Church, were pessimistic, and tended towards separation from established churches. Seven volumes of Morning Watch, or Quarterly Journal of Prophecy and Theological Review appeared from 1829 to 1833, edited by John Tudor; it was financed by Drummond, and propagated the Circle's line, which was pre-millennial, with a stress on an imminent Second Coming of Christ and the conversion of the Jews. At the final conference of 1830, the message from the chair directed attention to the "spiritual gifts" then thought to be being manifested in West Scotland.

A Morning Watch campaign, with Spencer Perceval, to continue the Apocrypha Controversy against the British and Foreign Bible Society was if anything counter-productive. James Edward Gordon was founder of the British Society for Promoting the Religious Principles of the Reformation, closely related to the Albury Circle, and also was a "Recordite", an associate of The Record edited by Alexander Haldane. Critics of the Circle included the brothers Gerard Thomas Noel and Baptist Wriothesley Noel. The former was a prophetical exegete with a closely related approach; the latter a prominent evangelical.

== Powerscourt Conferences (1831–1833) ==
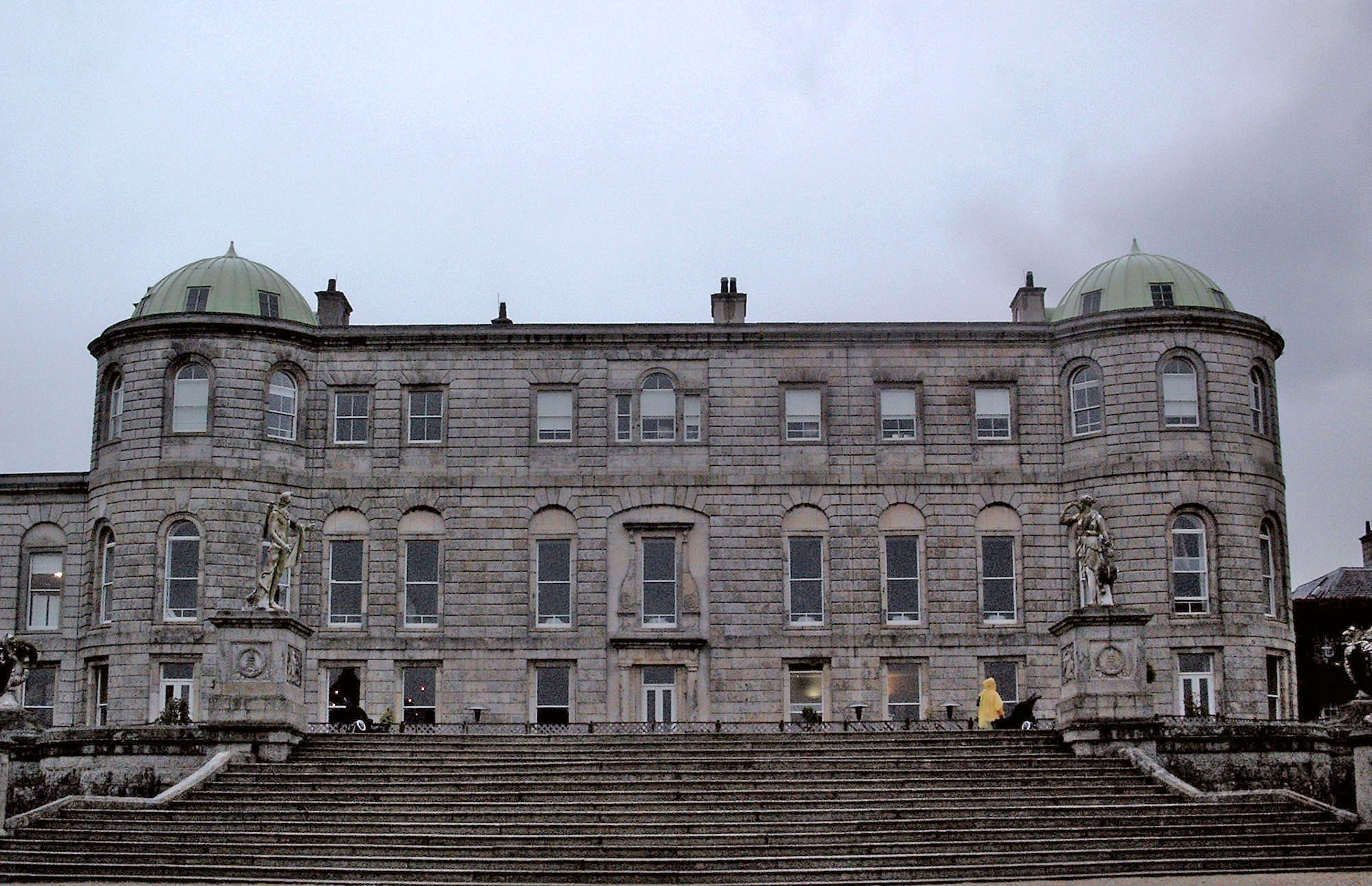
Powerscourt House, Wicklow, Ireland

The annual conferences at the Powerscourt Estate in Ireland were significant in the genesis of the Plymouth Brethren. John Nelson Darby was influenced by the Albury Circle.
