= John Kennaway =

John Kennaway may refer to:

- Sir John Kennaway, 1st Baronet (1758–1836), diplomat
- Sir John Kennaway, 2nd Baronet (1797–1873), of the Kennaway Baronets
- Sir John Kennaway, 3rd Baronet (1837–1919)
- Sir John Kennaway, 4th Baronet (1879–1956), of the Kennaway Baronets
- Sir John Lawrence Kennaway, 5th Baronet (b. 1933), of the Kennaway Baronets
