= At the Name of Jesus =

1870 Christian hymn by Caroline Maria Noel

- Genre: Hymn
- Written: 1870
- Text: Caroline Maria Noel
- Based on: Philippians 2:10-11
- Meter: 6.5.6.5 D
- Melody: "King's Weston" by Ralph Vaughan Williams, "Evelyns" by William Henry Monk, "Camberwell" by Michael Brierley

"At the Name of Jesus" is a hymn with lyrics written by Caroline Maria Noel. It was first published in 1870, in an expanded version of Noel's collection The Name of Jesus and Other Verses for the Sick and Lonely. At the time, Noel herself experienced chronic illness, which persisted until her death. The hymn has become popular across Christian denominations, and appears in over 200 hymnals. It has been set to many different tunes, including compositions by William Henry Monk, Ralph Vaughan Williams and Michael Brierley.

== History ==
Caroline Maria Noel was the daughter of Gerard Thomas Noel, a Church of England vicar and hymnwriter. She started writing poetry at the age of 17, but stopped when she was 20. She resumed writing at the age of 40, prompted by serious chronic illness. This chronic illness persisted until her death. She has been compared to Charlotte Elliott, as an example of a hymn writer whose compositions were "the outcome of her days of pain", and who "learned in suffering what she taught in song".

In 1861, she published a volume of verses entitled The Name of Jesus and Other Verses for the Sick and Lonely. As the title suggests, she particularly wrote with "the sick and lonely" in mind, and her verses were intended more for personal reflection than public singing. An enlarged edition was issued in 1870, which included "At the Name of Jesus". The original title was "Ascension Day", and it was written as a processional hymn for the Feast of the Ascension, celebrating the ascension of Jesus forty days after Easter.

The hymn later appeared in the 1875 edition of Hymns Ancient and Modern, and has been included in a wide variety of hymnals from different Christian denominations since then, including Methodist, Baptist, Presbyterian, United Reformed and non-denominational collections. In 1992, hymnologist Bert Polman has described it as an "essential hymn in the repertoire of most congregations today." According to hymnary.org, it has been published in around 250 hymnals.

The poet John Betjeman described the hymn as "perhaps the strongest hymn of a robust outward-looking kind to come from a woman's pen". Hymnologist Erik Routley described it as "the only completely objective theological hymn to come from the hand of a 19th-century woman writer", in contrast to the personal and subjective nature of hymns written by Noel's contemporaries.

In some books, the incipit begins "In the Name of Jesus", rather than "At the Name of Jesus". This is said to be a response to correspondence sent by the hymnwriter's family to the editors of Church Hymns (1903), expressing a wish for the text to follow the wording of the 1881 Revised Version of the Bible, rather than the 1611 Authorized Version.

== Text ==
=== Original text ===
The hymn is written in a 6.5.6.5.D metre, and originally had eight stanzas. It is partly based on the New Testament passage Philippians 2:5–11, which describes the incarnation, crucifixion and exaltation of Jesus. In the Authorized Version, verses 10–11 state that "at the name of Jesus every knee should bow, of things in heaven, and things in earth, and things under the earth, and that every tongue should confess that Jesus Christ is Lord, to the glory of God the Father."

The opening stanza draws on the wording of this verse, as well as incorporating language from John 1, describing Jesus as the one "who from the beginning was the mighty Word". The second stanza borrows language from the Nicene Creed, giving Jesus the title "Light of Light". The third stanza reflects Colossians 1:16, which describes how all things were created "by him and for him". The fourth verse describes the incarnation, life and death of Jesus, who was "humbled for a season".

The remainder of the hymn describes Christ's exaltation, before the congregation encourages each other to "name him", "enthrone him", "crown him" and "confess him King of glory", looking forward to his return. In the original sixth stanza, the second and third lines depart from the poetic metre of the rest of the hymn: the second line ("with love as strong as death") has six syllables instead of the expected five, and the third ("but humbly and with wonder") has seven instead of six.

Throughout, the language of the hymn is triumphant, with many references to victory and might. Jesus is presented as a victorious king, who the singer should "crown" as their captain, and "enthrone" him in their hearts, declaring in the final stanza that "all wreaths of empire / meet upon his brow".

=== Variations ===
Although originally comprising eight stanzas, most hymnals omit at least one verse. The 1875 edition of Hymns Ancient and Modern included seven stanzas, omitting the second verse. This seven-stanza version has been commonly reprinted, although some hymnals shorten the text further to just four or five stanzas.

The phrases "Name him, brothers, name him" and "Brothers, this Lord Jesus" are sometimes altered in the interest of gender-inclusivity, substituting "Christians" for "brothers" or making larger but similar changes.

== Tune ==
The hymn text has been set to various tunes in hymnbooks. In the Penguin Book of Hymns (1990), Ian Bradley notes that the hymn "can have a totally different impact depending on the tune to which it is sung."

One of the earliest tunes was "Evelyns", which was composed for these words by William Henry Monk, first appearing in the 1875 edition of Hymns Ancient and Modern. This has remained a popular tune, and is still included in contemporary hymnbooks. Hymnologist Erik Routley described this as "one of Monk’s most successful tunes".

In 1925, the hymnal Songs of Praise printed the words with the tune "King's Weston" by Ralph Vaughan Williams. The tune was named after Kings Weston House near Bristol. Archibald Jacob described this as "a dignifed, but not a solemn tune", which "must not be sung too slowly." Another common early tune was "Cuddesdon", by William Harold Ferguson, which was included in the Revised Church Hymnary (1927).

More recently, the hymn has appeared with the tune "Camberwell", written by Michael Brierley. This tune was first included in the 1960 book Thirty 20th Century Hymn Tunes, published under the aegis of the 20th Century Church Light Music Group. This tune is known for its rousing interlude between each stanza.
