= Albert Way =

English antiquary

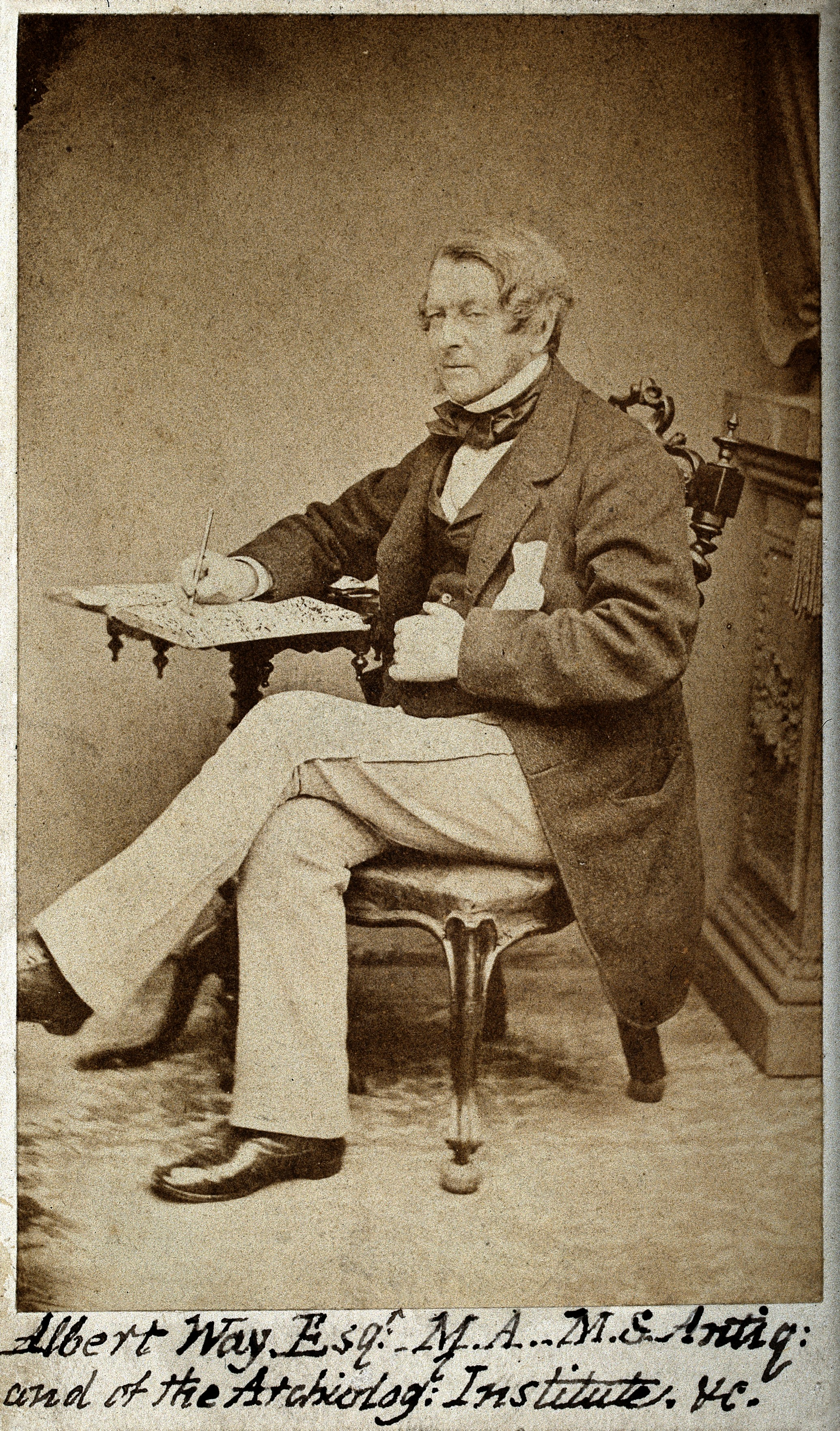
Portrait. Credit:Wellcome Library

Albert Way FSA (23 June 1805 – 22 March 1874) was an English antiquary, and principal founder of the Royal Archaeological Institute.

== Birth and family background ==
Way was born in Bath, Somerset, on 23 June 1805. He was the only son of Lewis Way (1772–1840) of Stansted Park, near Racton, Sussex, by his wife Mary (1780–1848), daughter of Herman Drewe, rector of Combe Raleigh, Devon. Lewis was the second son of Benjamin Way of Denham, Buckinghamshire, and elder brother of Sir Gregory Holman Bromley Way.

== Career ==
Albert Way was educated at home and at Trinity College, Cambridge. One of his Cambridge contemporaries was Charles Darwin, who joined the university in February 1828. A comic coat of arms drawn by May that April featured tobacco pipes, cigars, wine barrel and tankards, with a Latin announcement that they were best friends, and Way was more smoke-filled. Darwin actually took snuff, and did not drink wine excessively. He was encouraged by Way to continue his insect collecting. Way graduated BA in 1829, and MA in 1834. In his early life, he travelled in Europe and Palestine with his father. Following his father's death in 1840, Way was able to live off his private income.

In 1839, Way was elected fellow of the Society of Antiquaries of London. He served as the Society's Director from 1842 until 1846, when he moved to Wonham Manor in Betchworth, Surrey.

In 1843, Way became joint honorary secretary, with Charles Roach Smith, of the British Archaeological Association, newly founded by Smith and Thomas Wright. However, Way felt that Smith was too cautious in running the Association, so in 1845 he founded the rival Archaeological Institute (afterwards the Royal Archaeological Institute). He was one of the honorary secretaries to the Institute, and organised many of its meetings and exhibitions in different parts of the country. He had to reduce his involvement after 1863 for health reasons, but he continued to assist with the Institute's Journal until 1868.

Way was a skilful draughtsman and an authoritative antiquary, who contributed much to the publications of the Society of Antiquaries and other societies. In a paper published in Archaeologia in 1844, he coined the term "palimpsest brass". He compiled the first catalogue of the Society's collections of pictures, coins and other miscellaneous objects.

Way's principal publication was Promptorium parvulorum sive clericorum, an edition of the renowned 15th-century English-Latin dictionary Promptorium parvulorum. On behalf of the Camden Society, he published the work in three volumes, the first printing in 1843. The third and final volume came in 1865.

Way died at Cannes, France, on 22 March 1874.

== Personal life ==
Way married his cousin Emmeline Stanley, daughter of Lord Stanley of Alderley, on 30 April 1844. The couple had one daughter, Mary Alithea, born in 1850.

== Legacy ==
Way's widow presented the Society of Antiquaries with 150 volumes of dictionaries and glossaries from her husband's library, and two volumes of his drawings of prehistoric and other remains. She also presented his collection of several thousand impressions of medieval seals, which became the basis of the largest classified collection of British seal impressions.

The Society possesses a wax medallion portrait of Way by R. C. Lucas.

== Publications ==
- Way, Albert (1855). "Notice of a Bronze Relique, Assigned to the Later Roman or the Saxon Age, Discovered at Leckhampton, Gloucestershire". The Archaeological Journal. XII. The Archaeological Institute of Great Britain and Ireland: 7–21.
- Walford, Weston S. & Way, Albert (1856). "Examples of Mediæval Seals". The Archaeological Journal. XIII. The Archaeological Institute of Great Britain and Ireland: 62–76.
