= Gregory Way =

British Army general

Sir Gregory Holman Bromley Way (1776–1844) was an English lieutenant-general.

== Life ==
Born in London on 28 December 1776, Way was the fifth son of Benjamin Way (1740–1808), FRS, of Denham Place, Buckinghamshire, MP for Bridport in 1765, and of his wife Elizabeth Anne (1746–1825), eldest daughter of William Cooke, provost of King's College, Cambridge. His grandfather, Lewis Way (died 1771), director of the South Sea Company, and descendant of an old west-country family, first settled in Buckinghamshire. His aunt Abigail was the wife of John Baker-Holroyd, 1st Earl of Sheffield.

His brother, Lewis Way (1772–1840), was the father of the antiquary Albert Way (1805–1874).

He died at Brighton on 19 February 1844, and was buried in the family vault at Denham Church, Buckinghamshire. Way married, on 19 May 1815, Marianne, daughter of John Weyland, of Woodeaton, Oxfordshire, and Woodrising, Norfolk. He had no children.

== Career ==
He entered the army as an ensign in the 26th foot (Cameronians) in 1797. He was captured by French privateers when he was on his way to join his regiment in Canada, and was detained a prisoner in France for a year before he was exchanged. He was promoted to lieutenant in the 35th foot on 3 November 1799, and sailed with his regiment in the expedition under General Pigot on 28 March 1800 for the Mediterranean. Arriving at Malta in June, he took part in the siege of Valletta, which ended in the capitulation of the French on 5 September. He returned to England in 1802, and was promoted to be captain in the 35th foot on 13 August of that year. Shortly after that, he was placed on half-pay on reduction of that regiment.

Way was brought in as captain of the 5th foot on 20 January 1803, and, after serving in the Channel Islands, embarked with his regiment in the expedition under Lord Cathcart for the liberation of Hanover in 1805; but the vessel in which he sailed was wrecked off the Texel, and he was taken prisoner by the Dutch. After his exchange he sailed at the end of October 1806 in the expedition under Major-general Robert Craufurd, originally destined for Chile, to Cape de Verde, St. Helena, and the Cape of Good Hope. In accordance with orders received there, the expedition sailed for the River Plate, arriving at Montevideo in the beginning of June 1807, where it joined the force under General John Whitelocke, of which Way was appointed assistant quartermaster-general. At the storming of Buenos Ayres, Way led the right wing of the infantry brigade. He returned to England after the capitulation.

Way was promoted to major in the 29th Foot on 25 February 1808. He served under Sir Brent Spencer off Cadiz, and with him joined Sir Arthur Wellesley's army, landing in Mondego Bay, Portugal, on 3 August. He took part in the Battle of Roliça on 17 August, when, on gaining the plateau with a few men and officers of his regiment, he, when charged by the enemy, was rescued from the bayonet of a French grenadier by the humanity of General Brenier, and made a prisoner. He was exchanged in time to take part in the operations in Portugal when Sir Arthur Wellesley returned in April 1809. He commanded the light infantry of Brigadier-general R. Stewart's brigade, which led the advance of the British Army, and was present in the actions of the passage of the Vouga on 10 May and the heights of Grijon the following day, at the passage of the Douro and capture of Porto on the 12th, and in the subsequent pursuit of Soult's army.

At the Battle of Talavera on the night of 27 July, Way took part with his regiment, under Major-general Rowland Hill, in the gallant repulse at the point of the bayonet of the French attack of the heights on the left of the British position. He was present at the Battle of Bussaco on 27 September 1810, and at the Battle of Albuera on 16 May 1811, when, on the fall of his lieutenant-colonel, he succeeded to the command of the 29th Foot during the action, for which he received the medal. He was, when charging with his regiment, shot through the body and his left arm was fractured at the shoulder-joint by a musket-shot. He was promoted to be brevet lieutenant-colonel on 30 May 1811, and on 4 July of the same year was gazetted to the command of the 29th Foot.

On his return to England in 1812 with the skeleton of the 29th Regiment (about a hundred effective men), Way by considerable exertion reformed the corps, and embarked a second time for the Peninsula in 1813. In 1814, however, the effect of climate and wounds compelled him to return to England, when he was placed on the half-pay list of the 22nd Foot. For his services he was knighted the same year, and was awarded an annuity of £200 for his wounds, and received permission to accept and wear the insignia of a knight commander of the Portuguese Order of the Tower and Sword. On relinquishing the command of the 29th Foot he was presented by his brother officers with a valuable piece of plate as a memento of their esteem.

In 1815, Way was made a companion of the Order of the Bath, military division, and was appointed to the staff as deputy adjutant-general in North Britain. He was promoted to be colonel in the army on 19 July 1821. On the abolition of his staff appointment in Scotland he was nominated, on 7 November 1822, colonel of the 3rd Royal Veteran Battalion, which was disbanded in 1826, when Way was placed on half-pay. He was promoted to the rank of major-general on 22 July 1830, and lieutenant-general on 23 November 1841, and was given the colonelcy of the 1st West India Regiment on 21 November 1843.
