= Caroline Maria Noel =

English hymnwriter

- Born: 10 April 1817 Teston, Kent, England, UK
- Died: 7 December 1877 (aged 60) Hyde Park, London, England, UK
- Occupation: Hymnographer, Poet
- Period: 1834–1877
- Genre: Religion, Congressional
- Relatives: Gerard Thomas (Father); Charlotte Sophia (Mother); Anna Sophia (Sister); Louisa Diana (Sister); Charlotte (Sister); Emma (Sister); Elizabeth (Sister); Wriothesley Noel (Uncle)

Caroline Maria Noel (1817–1877) was an English evangelical Anglican hymnographer. Her processional hymn, "At the Name of Jesus", was noteworthy, growing in favor in England and in the U.S., and being included in many standard hymnals.

== Life ==
Noel was born in Teston, Kent on 10 April 1817. Her father was Gerard Thomas Noel, a Church of England vicar and hymn writer, her mother was Charlotte Sophia, and her paternal uncle was clergyman Baptist Wriothesley Noel. She had five sisters; Anna Sophia, Louisa Diana, Charlotte, Emma and Elizabeth. She died at 39 Cumberland Place, Hyde Park, London, on 7 December 1877, aged 60. She was buried at Romsey Abbey in Hampshire, where her father had served as vicar.

== Career ==
Noel started writing poetry at the age of 17. Her first hymn was entitled "Draw nigh unto my soul". She wrote a small number of other compositions, but stopped writing at the age of 20. After a long hiatus, she resumed writing poetry at the age of 40, prompted by serious chronic illness. In 1861, she published a volume of verses entitled The Name of Jesus and Other Verses for the Sick and Lonely. An enlarged edition was issued in 1870, which contained her most well-known composition, the hymn "At the Name of Jesus". More pieces were added in subsequent editions, bringing the total to 78, and the title was shortened to The Name of Jesus and Other Poems.

Noel has been compared to Charlotte Elliott, as an example of a hymn writer whose compositions were "the outcome of her days of pain". As the title of her collection suggests, she particularly wrote with "the sick and lonely" in mind. Her verses were intended more for personal reflection than for public singing, reflected in the fact that only "At the Name of Jesus" is still regularly sung.

== Notable works ==
- "At the Name of Jesus"
