= Henry Gauntlett (priest) =

English evangelist (1762–1833)

Henry Gauntlett (1762–1833) was an English cleric of evangelical views, known for his work on Biblical prophecy.

== Life ==
Born at Market Lavington, Wiltshire, on 15 March 1762, and educated at the grammar school of West Lavington, under the care of the Rev. Mr. Marks. After leaving school he was unemployed for some years, till, prompted by Rev. Sir James Stonehouse, he decided to enter the Church of England, and after three years' preparation was ordained in 1786, and became curate of Tilshead and Imber, villages about four miles distant from Lavington. He remained in the area, adding to his income by taking pupils, till his marriage in 1800. He then moved to the curacy of Botley, near Southampton.

Gauntlett left Botley in 1804 for the curacy of Wellington, Shropshire, which he occupied for a year, and then took charge of a chapel at Reading, Berkshire, not under episcopal jurisdiction. After two years' time he moved to the curacy of Nettlebed and Pishill, Oxfordshire; and then in 1811 to Olney, Buckinghamshire. In 1815 the vicar of Olney died, and Gauntlett obtained the living, which he held till his death in 1833.

== Works ==
Gauntlett was a close friend of Rowland Hill, and a significant supporter of the evangelical revival in the English church, in company with his predecessors at Olney, John Newton and Thomas Scott. He published several sermons during his lifetime, and collections of hymns for his parishioners.

In 1821 An Exposition of the Book of Revelation, rapidly passed through three editions, and brought its author the sum of £700. The second edition contained a letter against the opinion of "Basilicus" (Lewis Way), published in the Jewish Expositor, that during the millennium Christ would personally reign. In 1836 the Rev. Thomas Jones published an abridgment entitled The Interpreter; a Summary View of the Revelation of St. John … founded on … H. Gauntlett's Exposition.

After Gauntlett's death a collection of his sermons, in two volumes (1835), was published, with a memoir by his daughter Catherine. The appendix reprints portions of a work about John Mason of Water Stratford, Buckinghamshire, and thirty-eight letters written by William Cowper to Samuel Teedon.

== Family ==
Gauntlett married Arabella, the daughter of Edward Davies, rector of Coychurch, Glamorganshire in 1800. Their son Henry John Gauntlett was known as a composer. Their daughter Matilda married William Pole.

== Notes ==
Attribution

This article incorporates text from a publication now in the public domain: Stephen, Leslie, ed. (1890). "Gauntlett, Henry (1762-1833)". Dictionary of National Biography. Vol. 21. London: Smith, Elder & Co.
