= Gerard Thomas Noel =

Church of England cleric and hymn writer (1782–1851)

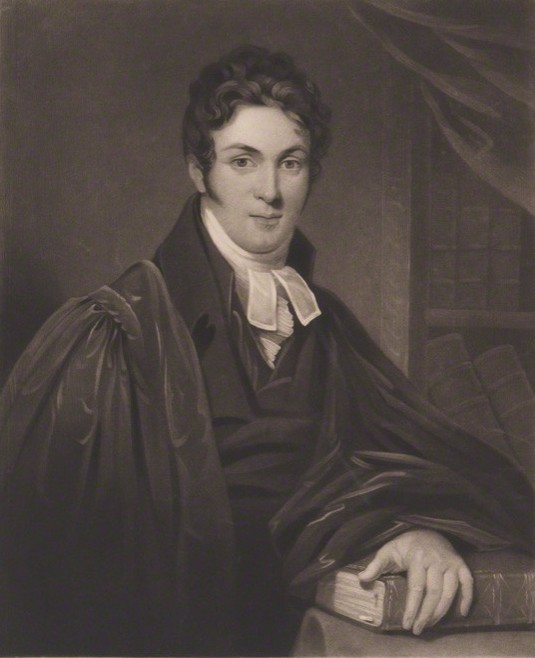
Gerard Thomas Noel

Gerard Thomas Noel (1782–1851) was a Church of England cleric, known as a hymn writer.

== Life ==
Born on 2 December 1782, he was second son of Sir Gerard Noel, 2nd Baronet, and Diana Noel, a baroness in her own right as the only child of Charles Middleton, 1st Baron Barham; one of a family of 18, he was elder brother of Baptist Wriothesley Noel. The eldest son Charles was created an Earl in 1841, and the brothers were given the courtesy prefix The Honourable. His mother was a noted patron of evangelical ministers and abolitionist.

Noel was at school in Langley, Kent. He was educated at the University of Edinburgh, entered Lincoln's Inn in 1798, and went to Trinity College, Cambridge, where he graduated B.A. in 1805 and M.A. in 1808.

On taking holy orders Noel held successively the curacy of Radwell, Hertfordshire and the vicarage of Rainham, Kent, also being curate at Richmond, Surrey. He became vicar of Romsey Abbey, Hampshire. He was instituted to Romsey in 1840. He was also appointed in 1834 to an honorary canonry at Winchester Cathedral. At Romsey he restored the abbey church.

Noel died at Romsey on 24 February 1851. He has been described as "a conservative evangelical whose theology was Calvinistic and premillennialist", and an opponent of the Catholic Apostolic Church.

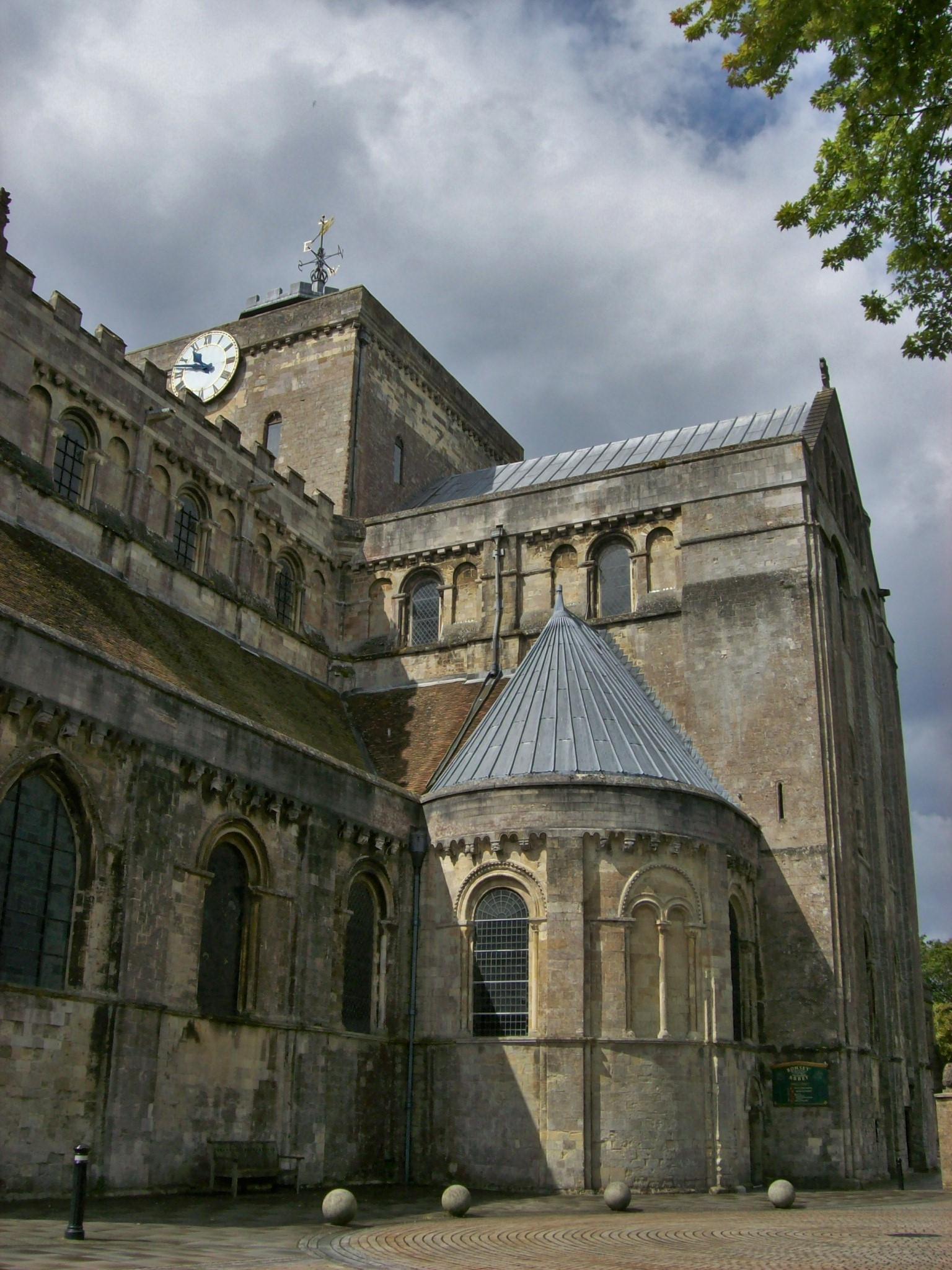
Romsey Abbey, today

== Works ==
Noel's published works were:

- A Selection of Psalms and Hymns for Public Worship, a compilation which includes compositions of his own, 1810.
- Arvendel, or Sketches in Italy and Switzerland, 1826.
- Fifty Sermons for the Use of Families, 1826, 1827.
- A Brief Inquiry into the Prospects of the Church of Christ, 1828.
- A Letter to ... Lord Teignmouth, President of the British and Foreign Bible Society, on the Present Character of the Institution, 1831. Noel and his brother Baptist Noel left the British and Foreign Bible Society in 1831, over a denominational issue; but they returned the following year.
- Fifty Sermons preached at Romsey, 1853, with preface by Samuel Wilberforce, a close friend.

== Family ==
Noel was twice married, first in 1806 to Charlotte Sophia, daughter of Sir Lucius O'Brien, 3rd Baronet, and secondly in 1841 to Susan, daughter of Sir John Kennaway, 1st Baronet. There were six daughters of the first marriage:

- Anna Sophia (died 1858), married in 1832 Philip Jacob, Archdeacon of Winchester.
- Louisa Diana
- Charlotte (died 1848), married in 1832 Rev. James Drummond Money, son of William Taylor Money, Member of Parliament. He became rector of Sternfield, and married a second wife, Clara Maria Money-Coutts. (Originally Clara Maria Burdett, she was the daughter of Sir Francis Burdett, 5th Baronet.)
- Emma (died 1843), married the Rev. Charles Edward Kennaway; who married a second time, in 1845, to Olivia Way, third daughter of Lewis Way.
- Elizabeth Welman (died 1868), married 1853 to Rev. George Augustus Seymour.
- Caroline Maria Noel (1817–1877) was known as a hymn writer.
