= Edward Irving =

Scottish clergyman

The Reverend Edward Irving
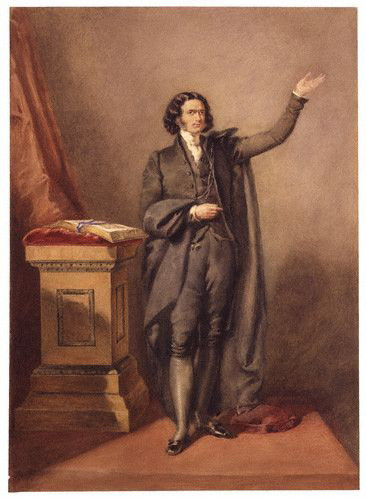
- Born: 4 August 1792; Annan, Annandale, Scotland
- Died: 7 December 1834 (aged 42); Edinburgh, Scotland
- Education: Annan Academy; University of Edinburgh (M.A., 1809)
- Spouse: Isabella Martin
- Church: Church of Scotland; Catholic Apostolic Church (forerunner)
- Ordained: June 1815
- Writings: For the Oracles of God, Four Orations (1823); For Judgment to come (1823); Babylon and Infidelity foredoomed (1826); Sermons, etc. (3 vols, 1828); Exposition of the Book of Revelation (1831); Introductions to The Coming of the Messiah, and to Horne's Commentary on the Psalms.

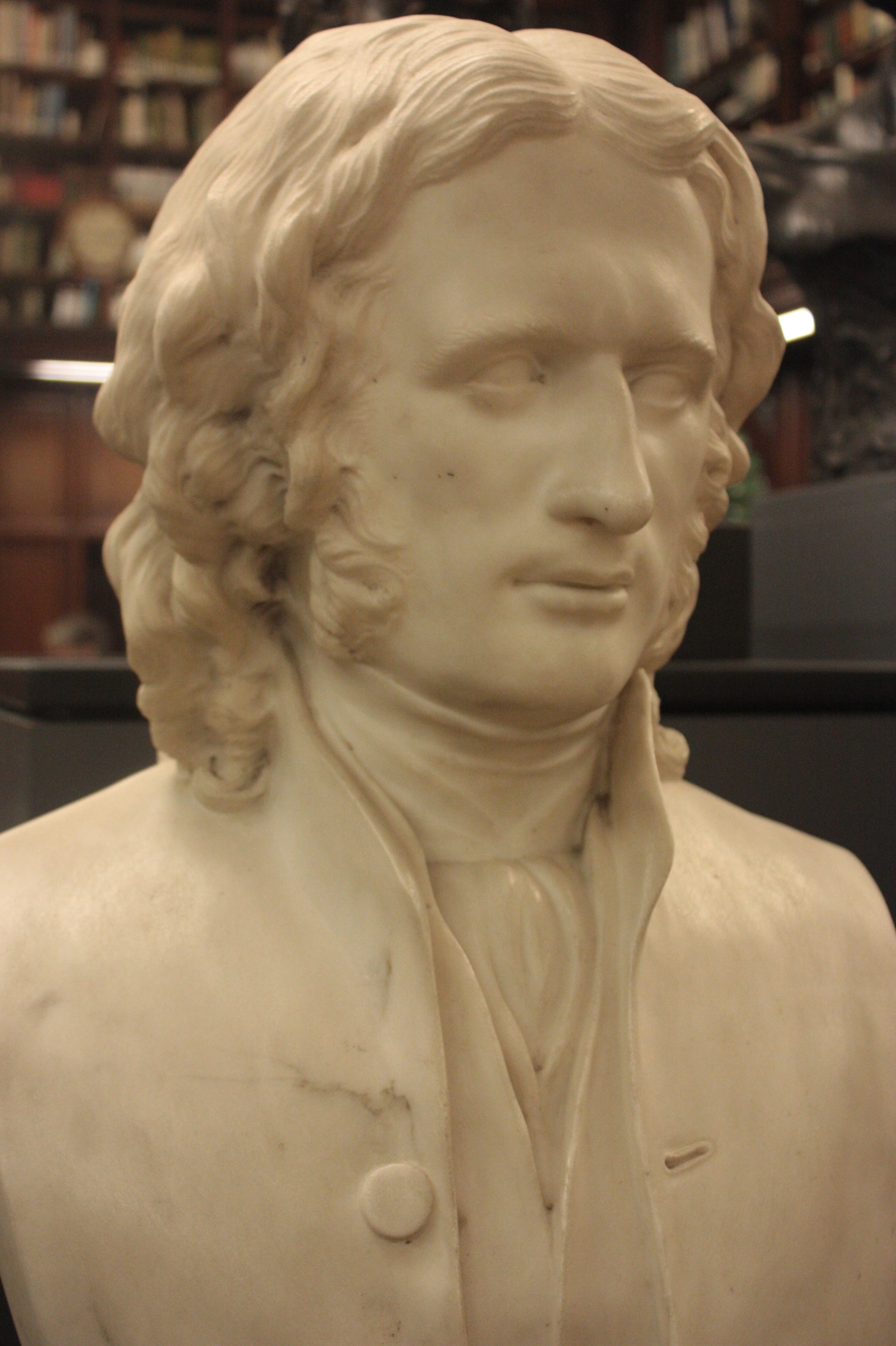
Edward Irving by Hamilton Wright MacCarthy, 1867

Edward Irving (4 August 1792 – 7 December 1834) was a Scottish clergyman, generally regarded as the main figure behind the foundation of the Catholic Apostolic Church.

== Early life ==
Edward Irving was born at Annan, Annandale, Scotland, the second son of Gavin Irving, a tanner, and his wife, Mary Lowther of Dornock. On his father's side he was descended from a family long known in the district which had ties to French Huguenot refugees. His mother's side, the Lowthers, were farmers or small proprietors in Annandale. He was first educated at a school kept by Peggy Paine, a relative of Thomas Paine, after which he entered the Annan Academy taught by Adam Hope.

== Scotland ==
Aged thirteen he entered the University of Edinburgh. In 1809 he graduated M.A.; and in 1810, on the recommendation of Sir John Leslie, he was chosen master of the mathematical school, newly established at Haddington, East Lothian. Amongst his pupils there were Jane Welsh, later famous as Mrs. Carlyle, one of the great letter-writers of the nineteenth century, and Thomas Burns.

He became engaged in 1812 to Isabella Martin, but he gradually fell in love with Jane Welsh, and she with him. He tried to break off his engagement with Isabella, but was prevented by her family. It was Irving, ironically, who in 1821 had introduced Thomas Carlyle, the essayist, to her. Eventually, in 1823, he married Isabella. (Confusingly, Irving was also influential in the life of another Scottish Thomas Carlyle, born a few years later, whom he eventually gave a position of some responsibility within his new church.)

His appointment at Haddington was exchanged for a similar one at Kirkcaldy Academy in Fife, in 1812. Completing his divinity studies by a series of partial sessions, he was licensed to preach in June 1815, but continued to discharge his scholastic duties for three years. He devoted his leisure, not only to mathematical and physical science, but to a course of reading in English literature, his bias towards the antique in sentiment and style being strengthened by a perusal of the older classics, among whom Richard Hooker was his favourite author. At the same time his love of the marvellous found gratification in the wonders of the Arabian Nights, and it is further related of him that he used to carry in his waistcoat pocket a miniature copy of Ossian, passages from which he frequently recited with sonorous elocution and vehement gesticulation.

In the summer of 1818, he resigned his mastership and to increase the probability of obtaining a permanent appointment in the Church of Scotland, took up his residence in Edinburgh. Although his exceptional method of address seems to have gained him the qualified approval of certain dignitaries of the church, the prospect of his obtaining a settled charge seemed as remote as ever. He was considering a missionary tour in Persia when he was arrested by steps taken by Thomas Chalmers which, after considerable delay, resulted in October 1819 in Irving being appointed his assistant and missionary in St John's parish, Glasgow.

Except in the case of a select few, Irving's preaching awakened little interest among the congregation of St John's. Chalmers himself, with no partiality for its bravuras and flourishes, compared it to Italian music, appreciated only by connoisseurs; but as a missionary among the poorer classes he wielded a powerful influence. The benediction "Peace be to this house", with which, in accordance with apostolic usage, he greeted every dwelling he entered, was not inappropriate.

== London ==
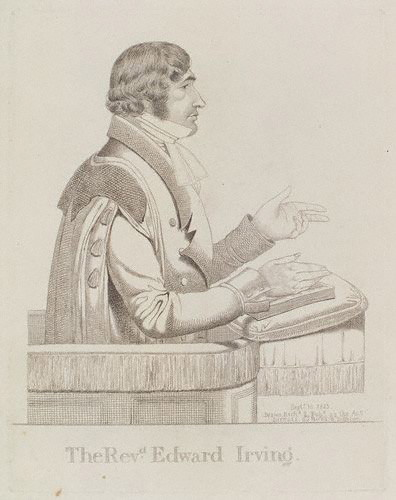
Edward Irving, in a sketch published in September 1823..

This half-success in a subordinate sphere was, however, so far from coinciding with his aspirations that he had again, in the winter of 1821, begun to turn his attention towards missionary labour in the East, when he received an invitation from the Caledonian Church, Hatton Garden, London (now the Lumen Church, Bloomsbury).

Due to that charge, he was ordained in July 1822. Some years previously, he had expressed his conviction that one of the chief needs of the age was reform sinners and non-believers.

With a sudden leap into popularity, he was compared to the eloquence made in the House of Commons by George Canning, who had been induced to attend his church from admiration of an expression in one of his prayers, quoted to him by Sir James Mackintosh. "His commanding stature, the symmetry of his form, the dark and melancholy beauty of his countenance, rather rendered piquant than impaired by an obliquity of vision, produced an imposing impression even before his deep and powerful voice had given utterance to its melodious thunders; and harsh and superficial half-truths enunciated with surpassing ease and grace of gesture, and not only with an air of absolute conviction but also with the authority of a prophetic messenger, in tones whose magical fascination was inspired by an earnestness beyond all imitation of art, acquired a plausibility and importance which, at least while the orator spoke, made his audience entirely forgetful of their preconceived objections against them. The subject-matter of his orations, and his peculiar treatment of his themes, no doubt also, at least at first, constituted a considerable part of his attractive influence."

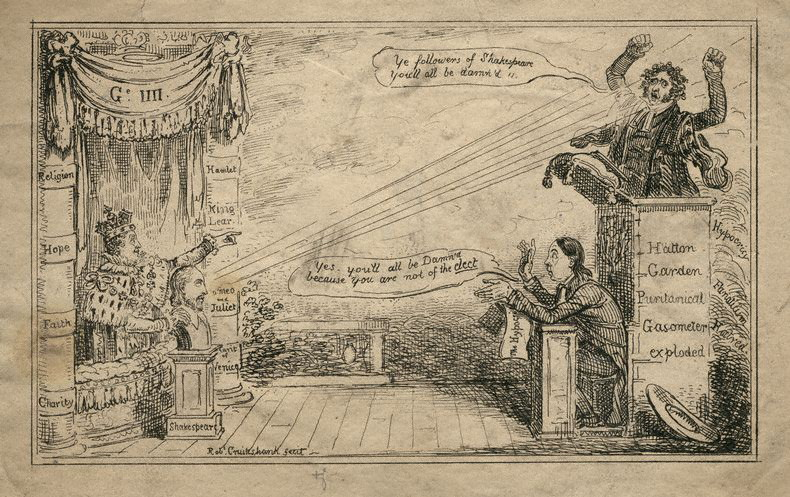
Caricature of Edward Irving's preaching by Isaac Robert Cruikshank (1824)

He had prepared himself, as he thought, for teaching political, legal, and scientific men; he did not attempt to win them through abstract, worn-out theological arguments, but discussed the opinions, poetry, politics, manners and customs of the time. Rather than address these issues through a comprehensive philosophical approach, Irving's method was one of severe satire varied by fierce denunciation.

A fire of criticism from pamphlets, newspapers and reviews opened on his volume of Orations, published in 1823; but the excitement produced was merely superficial and short lasting. Though having antipathy to ecclesiastical formulas, Irving's aim was to revive the antique style of thought and sentiment which had hardened into these formulas, and to supplant the new influences, the accidental and temporary moral shortcomings.

Being at variance with the thought of his time, the failure of his task was inevitable; and shortly after the opening of his new church in Regent Square in 1827, he found that his style was out of fashion and the church, though always well filled, was no longer crowded. By this desertion and in his despair, his tendency towards supernaturalism increased.

== Forerunner of the Catholic Apostolic Church ==
For years, the subject of prophecy had occupied much of Irving's thoughts, and his belief in the near approach of the second coming of Christ had received such positive corroboration by the work of a Jesuit priest, Manuel Lacunza, writing under the assumed Jewish name of "Juan Josafat Ben-Ezra", that in 1827, he published a translation of it. Probably the religious opinions of Irving, originally in some respects more catholic than protestant, had gained breadth and comprehensiveness from Samuel Taylor Coleridge, but gradually his chief interest in Coleridge's philosophy centred on what was mystical and obscure, and may be traced to the doctrine of millenarianism.

The first stage of his later development which resulted in the establishment of the Irvingite or Holy Catholic Apostolic Church in 1832, was associated with the Albury Conferences (1826–1830), moderated by Hugh Boyd M‘Neile (1795–1879), at his friend Henry Drummond's seat, Albury Park at Albury, Surrey, concerning unfulfilled prophecy, followed by an almost exclusive study of the prophetical books and especially of the Apocalypse, and by several series of sermons on prophecy in London and the provinces. His apocalyptic lectures in 1828 filled the largest churches of Edinburgh, Scotland on summer mornings.

In 1830, however, he experienced a revival of gifts of prophecy and healing which he had already in 1828 persuaded himself had only been kept in abeyance by the absence of faith. He welcomed the new powers even though they caused the desertions of his dearest friends, his own descent into a subordinate position, and his rejection by the church. His excommunication by the Presbytery of London in 1830 for publishing his doctrines of the humanity of Jesus Christ, and the condemnation of these opinions by the General Assembly of the Church of Scotland in the following year, were secondary episodes. They affected the main issue of his career as they further isolated him from the sympathy of the church and the irregularities connected with the manifestation of the gifts gradually estranged the majority of his own congregation, and on the complaint of the trustees to the Presbytery of London, whose authority his local church had formerly rejected, he was declared unfit to remain the minister of the National Scotch Church of Regent Square.

After he and those who adhered to him (describing themselves as of the Holy Catholic Apostolic Church) had in 1832 moved to a new building in Newman Street, he was, in March 1833, deposed from the ministry of the Church of Scotland by the Presbytery of Annan on the original charge of heresy.

Having been expelled from the Church of Scotland, Irving took to preaching in the open air in Islington, until a new church was built for him and his followers on Duncan Street, Islington. It was funded by Duncan Mackenzie of Barnsbury, a former elder of Irving's London church, and built by the Holborn firm of Stevenson & Ramage. It closed in the 1970s.

After some delay, he was reordained chief pastor of the church assembled in Newman Street. He died on 7 December 1834. He is buried in the crypt of Glasgow Cathedral near to the tomb of St. Mungo.

== Monument ==
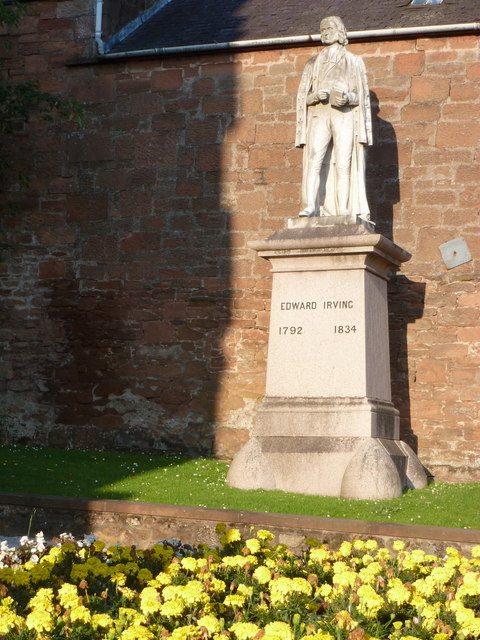
Statue of Edward Irving in Annan churchyard

There is a statue of Irving in the grounds of Annan Old Parish Church in Dumfriesshire. It was sculpted by J. W. Dods of Dumfries. It was unveiled by Archibald Charteris in 1892 on the centenary of Irving's birth.

== Family ==
In October 1823, he married Isobel Martin, daughter of Rev. Dr. John Martin DD of Kirkcaldy. They had at least eight children, the first four of which died in infancy. He lived at 4 Claremont Square, Islington, London. Their surviving children included Isabella Irving (b. 1834) who married Samuel Rawson Gardiner and Martin Howy Irving, who moved to Australia.

== Bibliography ==
The writings of Irving published during his lifetime were:

- For the Oracles of God, Four Orations (1823)
- For Judgment to come (1823)
- Babylon and Infidelity foredoomed – A Discourse on the Prophecies of Daniel and the Apocalypse which relate to these latter times, and until the Second Advent (1826, 2nd ed. 1828)
- Sermons, etc. (3 vols, 1828)
- Exposition of the Book of Revelation (1831)
- an introduction to The Coming of Messiah in Glory and Majesty, a translation of Manuel Lacunza's book
- an introduction to Horne's Commentary on the Psalms.

His collected works were published in five volumes, edited by Gavin Carlyle. The Life of Edward Irving, by Margaret Oliphant, appeared in 1862 in two volumes. Among a large number of biographies published previously, that by Washington Wilks (1854) has some merit. See also Hazlitt's Spirit of the Age; Coleridge's Notes on English Divines; Carlyle's Miscellanies, and Carlyle's Reminiscences, vol. 1. (1881).
