= Sir John Kennaway, 1st Baronet =

British soldier and diplomat

Sir John Kennaway, 1st baronet (6 March 1758 – 1 January 1836), of Escot House in the parish of Talaton in Devon, was a British soldier and diplomat.

== Life ==
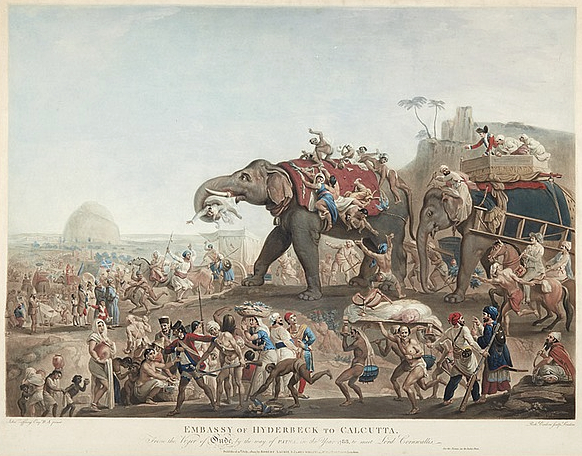
The Embassy of Hyderbeck to Calcutta, from the Vizier of Oude, by way of Patna, in the Year 1788, to meet Lord Cornwallis, showing John Kennaway as diplomat, in the howdah on the elephant to the right

After Kennaway left Exeter Grammar School in 1772, he became a cadet of the East India Company's forces, through the influence of Robert Palk, a relation on his mother's side.

Kennaway served in the Carnatic, marching south with a brigade from the Presidency of Bengal in 1781, and taking part in the Second Anglo-Mysore War. He served as British Resident at the Court of Nizam Ali Khan, Asaf Jah II, Nizam of Hyderabad. In September 1788 he implemented the agreed transfer of the Northern Circars from Hyderabad to the Presidency of Madras

In recognition of his part in the negotiation of the 1790 alliance between the Nizam and the East India Company against Tipu Sultan, Kennaway in 1791 he was created a baronet "of Hyderabad". He concluded a treaty with Tipu Sultan in 1792.

In 1794 Kennaway returned to England, and purchased Escot House, Ottery St Mary.

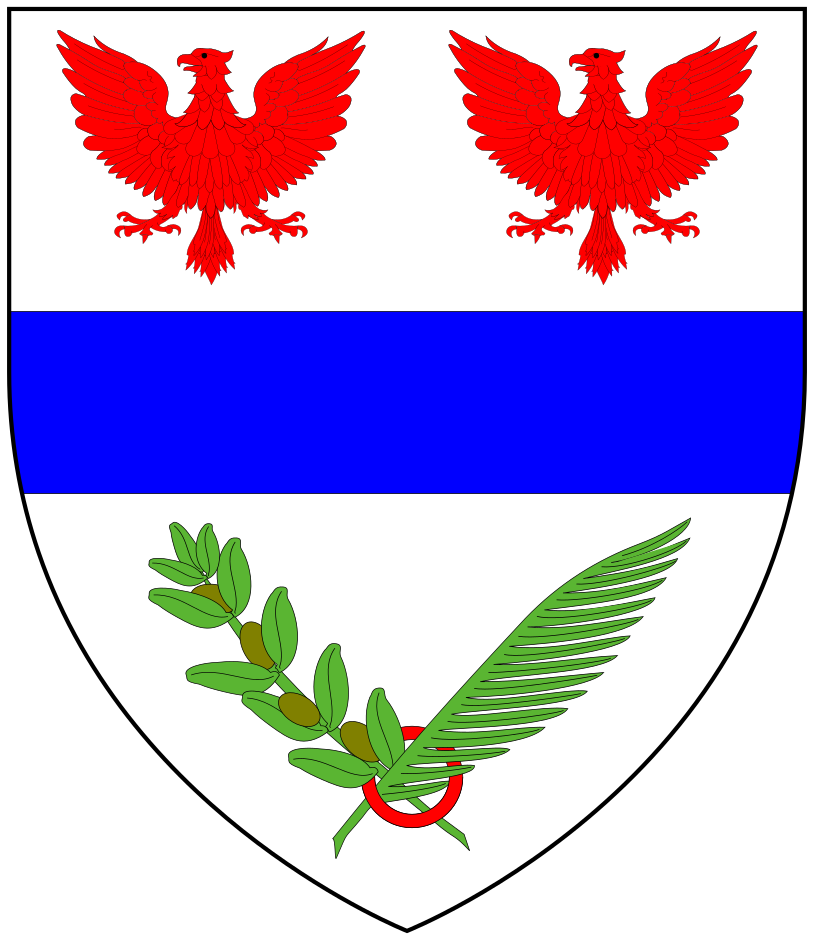
Arms of Kennaway: Argent, a fess azure between two eagles displayed in chief gules and in base through an annulet of the third a slip of olive and another of palm in saltire proper

== Family ==
Kennaway married Charlotte Amyatt, daughter of James Amyatt; they had seven sons and five daughters. Their son, Sir John Kennaway, who succeeded as 2nd Baronet, married Emily Frances Kingscote (b. 2 Aug 1805, d. 16 May 1858) on 28 April 1831. He was a noted evangelical Christian.

The eldest daughters were Charlotte Eliza (1799–1875), who married George Templer, and Maria (1801–1876), who married Francis William Newman. Frances married Edward Cronin in 1838; and Susan married Gerard Thomas Noel, as his second wife. The other daughter was Augusta.

The second son, Charles Edward Kennaway (1800–1875) was a graduate of St John's College, Cambridge and a cleric. He married firstly Emma, daughter of Gerard Thomas Noel, and secondly Olivia, daughter of Lewis Way. He and his elder brother John visited Robert Southey in their student days. Two other sons, Laurence (died 1822) and William Richard, were in the Bengal Civil Service.

Baronetage of Great Britain
| New creation | Baronet (of Hyderabad); 1791–1836 | Succeeded by John Kennaway |
