= Henry Gauntlett =

English organist and songwriter

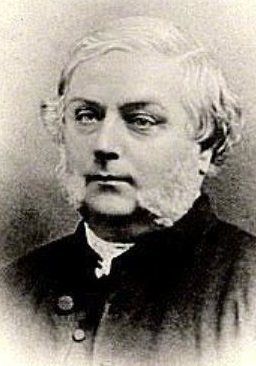
Henry Gauntlett

Henry John Gauntlett (9 July 1805 in Wellington, Shropshire – 21 February 1876 in London) was an English organist and songwriter known in British music circles for his authorship of many hymns and other pieces for the organ.

== Biography ==
Henry John Gauntlett was born on 9 July 1805, in Wellington, Shropshire, England. At the age of nine he became the organist at Olney church in Buckinghamshire, where his father Henry Gauntlett was then curate, and later vicar.

He was intended for a career in law, and he remained a lawyer until he was almost forty years of age, when he abandoned the profession and devoted himself to music.

He was organist at a number of leading London churches, including All Saints Notting Hill and St Olave's in Tooley Street, Southwark from 1827 to 1846, where he designed a new grand organ which was built, installed and perfected to his satisfaction between 1844 and March 1846, and Union Chapel, Islington from 1852 to 1861. He was close friends with Felix Mendelssohn who chose Gauntlett to be the organist at the premiere of Mendelssohn’s oratorio Elijah on 26 August 1846 at the Birmingham Town Hall.

Eventually the degree of Mus. Doc. was conferred on him by the Archbishop of Canterbury, he being the first to receive such a degree from that quarter for over 200 years. He did much to raise the standard of church music both mechanically and musically.

In 1852 he patented an "electrical-action apparatus" for organs. He wrote much music and over 1,000 hymn tunes, and edited many hymn books. His most famous tune is "Irby", the tune to which the Christmas carol, "Once in Royal David's City" is usually sung.

Gauntlett died in London aged seventy in 1876 and was buried at Kensal Green Cemetery.

== Hymns ==
- Hymn tune 'St Alphege' (AElfheah of Canterbury) set to the words 'Brief life is here our portion' by John Mason Neale from the Latin: 'Sic breve vivitur' by Bernard of Cluny (New English Hymnal #326b).
- Hymn tune 'University College' set to the words 'Oft in danger, oft in woe' by Henry Kirke White.
- Hymn tune 'Hawkhurst' set to the hymn 'Come, gracious Spirit, heavenly Dove' by Simon Browne 1680-1732 and others (New English Hymnal 347)
- Hymn tune 'St Albinus' (Albinus of Angers) set to the hymn 'Jesus lives! Thy terrors now' by Christian Furchtegott Gellert 1715-1769 (New English Hymnal 112)
- Hymn tune 'Irby' is set to the carol 'Once in Royal David's City' (Hymns Ancient & Modern New Standard #46).
