= Manuel Lacunza =

Chilean Jesuit theologian (1731–1801)

Manuel de Lacunza, S.J.
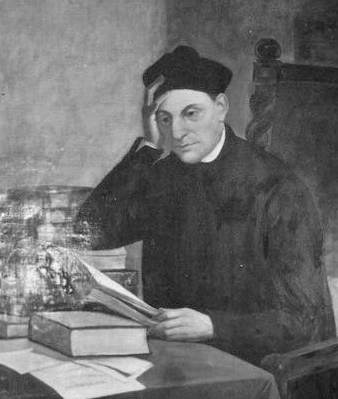
- Lacunza through the eyes of 19th century artist Alexander Ciccarelli
- Born: July 19, 1731; Santiago, Chile
- Died: c. June 18, 1801; Imola, Cisalpine Republic
- Occupation: Priest
- Known for: Expositor of Bible prophecies

Manuel de Lacunza y Díaz, S.J. (July 19, 1731 – c. June 18, 1801) was a Jesuit priest who used the pseudonym Juan Josafat Ben-Ezra in his main work on the interpretation of the prophecies of the Bible, which was entitled The Coming of the Messiah in Majesty and Glory.

== Biography ==
The son of Carlos de Lacunza Ziaurris and Josefa Díaz Durán, wealthy merchants engaged in colonial trade between Lima and Chile, Manuel entered the Society of Jesus (Jesuits) in 1747. After the usual Jesuit training he was ordained to the priesthood in 1766 but began his service as a teacher of grammar in the es:Universidad Pontificia Colegio Máximo de San Miguel in the Chilean capital, where he gained moderate fame as a pulpit orator.

In 1767 King Charles III of Spain expelled the Jesuits from Spain and its possessions, (including South America) and Lacunza was sent into exile, first in Cádiz, Spain, and then in the Italian town of Imola, near Bologna in central Italy, where he found refuge with other Chilean Jesuits. Charles threatened to withdraw his subsidy of 100 piastres per annum if any Jesuit wrote in self-defence or in criticism of this move. Lacunza's life as a priest-in-exile was made more difficult when the next pope, Pope Clement XIV, issued the brief, Dominus ac Redemptor, which banned Jesuits from celebrating Mass or other sacraments, for which a fee was charged. In addition, his family in Chile fell on hard times and the remittances on which Lacunza relied became increasingly scarce.

During this time, Lacunza began an intensive programme of study, first of the Church Fathers and then of Biblical prophecies. He read all the commentaries available to him and after 1779 restricted his study solely to the Scriptures.

After five years of communal living with the other exiled Jesuits, Lacunza retired to a house on the outskirts of Imola where he lived alone, apart from a mysterious person whom he calls in his letters, "my good mulatto". During this time some of his Jesuit colleagues described him as "a man whose retirement from the world, his parsimonious way of life, the neglect of his own person, even from the comforts necessary to human life, and his indefatigable application to study, earned him the respect and admiration of all".

In 1773 Lacunza received another blow when, by the bull "Dominus ac Redemptor", the pope dissolved the Jesuit order in return for territorial concessions by France and Spain who were threatening the Papal States, the so-called "Patrimony of St Peter". Thus, by decree, Lacunza was reduced to a secular status.

Combined with the theological and Biblical study he had undertaken, this personal trauma led Lacunza to adopt a millenarian view of the near future. His developing ideas were first published in a 22-page tract known as "The Anonymous Millennium" which was widely circulated in South America (there is evidence that Lacunza did not authorise this publication and was annoyed by it). The tract gave rise to heated public debate, particularly in Buenos Aires. Lacunza's opponents denounced him to the Inquisition, which banned the booklet.

In 1790 Lacunza completed the three volumes of his major work, "The Coming of the Messiah in Glory and Majesty" (La venida del Mesías en gloria y majestad). Recognising that royal patronage was the surest guarantee that his work would be published and that he would be protected against his enemies, he made repeated attempts to obtain approval by the Spanish court, but in this he was unsuccessful. However his book circulated in manuscript form in Spain and in the whole of South America.

The exact date of his death is uncertain because his body was found in a pit beside a road some distance from Imola. At the time it was assumed that the septuagenarian priest had died of natural causes while on one of his solitary walks.

== The fate of his work ==
Despite the prohibition of the Inquisition, "La venida del Mesías en gloria y majestad" was secretly printed in Cádiz in 1810 or 1811 under the Jewish pseudonym of Rabbi Juan Josaphat ben-Ezra. A second edition was printed in Spain in 1812 and a third, in Castilian and funded by the Argentine General Manuel Belgrano, was published in London in 1816. In the same year the book was denounced before the Spanish courts and on January 15, 1819, the Spanish Inquisition ordered that the book be removed from circulation. Further editions were printed in Mexico in 1821/1822, in Paris in 1825, and again in London in 1826.

In September 1824, Pope Leo XII placed it on the Index of Prohibited Books. Those who opposed the book expressed particular concern about the appeal Lacunza's ideas exerted among the more conservative and active clergy. A pamphlet denouncing Lacunza's book, published in Madrid in 1824, was subtitled, "Observations to Guard the Public against the Seduction the Work can Cause".

Following the book's publication in London, the Rev Edward Irving, who formed the Catholic Apostolic Church after being disfellowshiped from the Presbyterian Church, came across Lacunza's work. He had already begun to learn Spanish by allowing a refugee Spanish officer to tutor him as a way of helping the man. He was so impressed by Lacunza's work that he spent the summer of 1826 translating it into English. In 1827 his two-volume translation was published under the title "The Coming of the Messiah in Majesty and Glory".

== Lacunza's Ideas ==
Lacunza believed that he had made some "new discoveries, in a subject which certainly is not one of mere curiosity, but of the greatest interest." The first of these "new discoveries" was that "I am not of the opinion that the world – that is, the material bodies or celestial globes that God has created (among which is the one on which we live) – has to have an end, or return to chaos or nothingness from which it came forth." He protested against the common teaching that at the end of the world, the earth would be consumed by fire and quoting from an Apocryphal Wisdom of Solomon text, which is found in Catholic Bibles, but not in Protestant Bibles, declared:

How can it be a universal fire which burneth up and consumeth every thing without exception upon our globe, and the globe itself, when the scripture saith, 'Then shall the right aiming thunderbolts go abroad; and from the clouds, as from a well drawn bow, shall they fly to the mark – Wisdom 21.'

Secondly, Lacunza concluded that the Biblical expressions "end of the age" and "end of the world" refer to two different times. He understood the "end of the age" or "day of the Lord" as merely the end of a phase of human history that would be closed by the coming of Christ and the beginning of His kingdom on Earth. At this time the living would be judged and the Jews converted, after which a new society would be established for a thousand-year reign of justice and peace.

El Terino (a very learned author) … His words are these: 'But it shall be fully accomplished towards the end of the world, in the general conversion of all the Jews unto Christ.' That which is here declared and avowed by this learned man, is substantially the same which I say, with this only difference, that I place after the end of the age, the same event which he without any reason pretends to place 'towards the end of the world.' … along with this great event announced in almost all the scriptures, you shall likewise find at the end of this present earth, or which is the same, the end of the day of men, which the Lord so frequently called the consummation of this age; and immediately after this day, you shall find that of the Lord, the age to come, the kingdom of God, the new earth and the new heavens, wherein dwelleth righteousness, peace, love, and uniformity in the same faith, in the same worship, in the same laws and customs, a uniformity of language among all the peoples, tribes, and families of the whole earth.

While the "end of the world" will be marked by the resurrection of the dead and the Last Judgement, this event would take place after the thousand years of Christ's pacific earthly kingdom, at which the dragon would then be loosed, so that the nations might once again be deceived, at which fire then comes down from heaven and consumes the dragon, the beast and the false prophet in the "lake of fire" (Rev. 20:9,10). After this, the "last judgment, the ultimate sentence" of the "second death" takes place before the throne of God, as described in Revelation 22:11, at which "the greatness, the majesty, the infinite sovereignty of that throne and of the supreme prince who sitteth thereon, before whose presence, and in whose sight the heaven and earth should flee away and hide themselves, with all who dwell, and all are found therein." According to Lacunza:

If the xxth chapter of the Apocalypse is to be literally understood, Jesus Christ himself with all his saints now risen, ought actually to reign in Jerusalem over the whole orb of the earth, and that for a thousand years … It ought then be admitted, that those thousand years of the pacific kingdom of Jesus Christ, being passed into innocence, in goodness, and righteousness, the dragon will once again be loosed, and will return to deceive the whole world … What wonder then, if after a thousand years, (or, if you please, a hundred thousand) of righteousness and goodness, the world should once more come to be perverted? … Nevertheless, among these individual things pertaining to this very mystery, I find only one which I am not ignorant of, nor can fail to perceive, which is, the circumstance of the time at which the whole mystery shall come to pass. I mean that the whole mystery, or which is the same thing, the resurrection of all the individuals of Adam's race, the last judgment, the ultimate sentence, and the execution of this ultimate sentence, cannot take place immediately upon and in the very natural day of the coming in glory and majesty of our Lord Jesus Christ; because that idea is visibly and evidently repugnant to the text of St. John [in the book of Revelation].

== Lacunza's position on the identification of the Antichrist ==
Lacunza's interpretation of Biblical prophecy led him to believe that during the period before the "day of the Lord" there would be an apostasy within the Catholic Church which would make it part of a general system which he labelled Antichrist, in the sense that there would be a general "falling away" in doctrine among the churches, resulting in moral apostasy. In this sense the Antichrist would be composed of "a moral antichristian body, composed of many individuals … animated by the same spirit", which would consist of "seven false religions [that] should unite to make war against the body of Christ, and against Christ himself" – which was in accordance with his personal interpretation of Revelation 13:1. In The Coming of the Messiah in Majesty and Glory, Lacunza compared his views on the Antichrist – that Antichrist was a general moral apostasy within the churches – with what he declared to be the "universally recognized" view of his day:

This Antichrist is universally recognized as a king, or most potent monarch … It is commonly said, that he will take his origin from the Jews, and from the tribe of Dan … shall feign himself Messiah, and begin to perform so many and such stupendous works, that the fame thereof being soon spread abroad, the Jews shall fly from all parts of the world, and from all the tribes, to join themselves to him, and offer him their services … After Antichrist shall have conquered Jerusalem, he shall, with great ease, conquer the rest of the earth … The ambition of this miserable and vilest Jew, shall not rest satisfied, by becoming the universal king of the whole earth … but he shall immediately enter into the impious and sacrilegious thought of making himself God, and the only God of the whole earth … Whereupon shall arise the most terrible, the most cruel perilous persecution against the church of Jesus Christ; and it shall last for three years and a half … Upon his death the church, and the whole world, shall begin to breathe again, every thing reverting to a perfect calm, and a universal joy. The Bishops, who had concealed themselves in mountains, shall return and resume their sees, accompanied by their clergy and some other Christian families, who had followed them in their voluntary exile. At this time shall come to pass, the conversion of the Jews, according to the universal spirit of the converters.

Although this view – that the Antichrist was an individual who would be a Jew – was first formed by fellow Jesuit Francisco Ribera in the latter part of the sixteenth century, this was a far from universal view on the identity of the Antichrist, as until this time it had been completely rejected by Protestants.

In 1540, Basque knight Ignatius Loyola and a handful of followers received permission from Pope Pius III to form the order of the Jesuits, who would provide shock troops for an intellectual assault on Protestant beliefs. While the Roman curia maintained its traditional Augustinian reticence on things apocalyptic, it occurred to the Jeuits that the reformers were surprisingly vulnerable in this area. If they could show that Luther, Zwingli and Calvin had ignored the Apocalypse, they could cut the ground from under Protestant feet and present themselves as the defender of scripture. Their immediate task was to break the connection between Antichrist and the papacy. In around 1580, Spanish Jesuit Francisco Ribera began work on a commentary on Revelation, which challenged the 'historical' Protestant analysis of biblical prophecy. Abandoning the literal thousand year millennium, he focused on Daniel's 'a time, two times, and half a time,' if 'a time' represented a year, he concluded, then the period added up to three and a half years – or 1260 days. Uncoupling Daniel from Revelation, he argued that only John's letters to the churches [in the Book of Revelation] in the first three chapters referred to events that happened in the past. All the rest … lay in the future and would be accomplished within the coming three and a half years of Tribulation. Since the papacy was timeless, it followed that the Antichrist had to be a single, identifiable human being, who had yet to arrive. Citing Western and Eastern church fathers, Ribera argued that this destroyer would be a Jew who would appear in Jerusalem, rebuild Solomon's Temple, accept the worship of the Jewish people, before ruling for that terrible period of three and a half years. This Antichrist would finally claim divine power and conquer the world while locusts in the form of barbarian races wreaked havoc on the human race. As the church fled into the wilderness, six heavenly trumpets would blow, with the last sounding the end of Tribulation after the Antichrist's death. Although Protestants reacted with alarm, Ribera's apocalyptic vision found no immediate favor in the Vatican. While he had taken care to describe the papacy of his own time as the 'mother of piety, pillar of the Catholic faith and witness of sanctity,' he did admit that, it had in the past been the Whore of Babylon and he predicted that it would apostatize at the end of time. Still respected Jesuit Cardinal Bellarmine set about importing Rebera's key concepts of the individual Jewish Antichrist and the three-and-a-half-year tribulation into mainstream Catholic theology. Positioning the Roman church as the defender of scripture, he publicized the reformer's doubts on whether the two apocalyptic books of Daniel and the Revelation had any place in the Bible and even suggested a way in which the name 'Luther' could be converted to the beast's symbol, 666. As Protestants clung to 'historical' methods of prophetic analysis, Cardinal Bellarmine steered Catholic apocalyptic towards events that were to be fulfilled in the future.

As Lacunza compared his own personal view on the identity of the Antichrist with Ribera's views within his book The Coming of the Messiah in Majesty and Glory, thus both views of the Jesuits on the identity of the Antichrist were effectively presented to Protestantism within its pages. While Irving rejected Lacunza's personal view that there would be a general moral apostasy within the church, he instead readily accepted Ribera's view, which taught that the Antichrist would be a "Jewish destroyer" who would wreak havoc upon the earth. By the mid-nineteenth century, it had taken shape under as the basis of a prophetic mode of Biblical interpretation which is known as Futurism. According to church historian Le Roy Froom, this interpretation of "The Futurist view of an individual Jewish Antichrist was unknown among the Protestants of North America prior to the nineteenth century."

== The Reformers' position on the identification of the Antichrist ==
Futurist interpretations of prophecy differed from that of Baptist preacher William Miller and other prominent Protestants of the period, whose focus was on a mode of Biblical prophecy which is known as Historicism. This was inclusive of men such as Martin Luther, the Evangelical German Reformer, John Knox, founder of the Presbyterian Church in Scotland, Roger Williams, founder of the Baptist Church in the United States of America, Charles Wesley, founder of the Methodist Church in England, and prominent 17th century scientist, Sir Isaac Newton, who discovered the Law of Gravity. While Futurism teaches that most of the events which are described in the Book of Revelation (including the appearance of the Antichrist) will take place sometime in an indefinite future, purveyors of Historicism believe that the exegesis and hermeneutics of prophetic revelation are principally found in the Biblical books of Daniel and the Revelation. While Daniel describes events of that period until the first advent of Christ, at which an outline of the history of the Christian church is given until the second advent of Christ, the Book of Revelation begins in the first century A.D and then outlines the prophetic fate of the church, which continues to the second coming of Christ. According to Historicists, "The Books of Daniel and the Revelation explain each other, they fit like a hand in a glove." Historicist author/evangelist Kenneth Cox believes that Christ Himself has instructed the reader to read Daniel, so that "whoever reads [Daniel], let him understand".

All the prophecies of Daniel are repeated in the Book of Revelation, and they help us to clearly see what is taking place today. The Book of Daniel is a book of prophecy; whereas the Book of Revelation is just what its title states it is, a 'revelation.'

Historicists believe that the identity of the Antichrist is revealed in the prophecies which are found within the books of Daniel and the Revelation, as well as the Apostle Paul's second letter to the Thessalonian church, in which verses 2 and 3 describe the Antichrist as "the man of sin" and "son of perdition, who opposes and exalts himself above all that is called God, so that he sits as God in the temple of God, showing himself that he is God." In reference to this passage of the Bible, Martin Luther wrote:

Oh Christ, my Master, look down upon us and bring upon us your day of judgment, and destroy the brood of Satan in Rome! There sits the Man, of whom the Apostle Paul wrote (2 Thess. 2:3,4) that he will oppose and exalt himself above all that is called God – that man of sin, that Son of Perdition.

Most commentators agree that statements such as this were typical of the view held by the Reformers of the Papacy. According to Edward Hendrie, author of Solving the Mystery of Babylon the Great:

The belief that the pope is the antichrist was once a virtually unanimous belief among Protestant denominations. In fact, the Westminster Confession of Faith (Church of England) states: 'There is no other Head of the Church but the Lord Jesus Christ, nor can the Pope of Rome, in any sense, be head thereof, but is that antichrist, that man of sin, and Son of perdition, that exalteth himself in the Church against Christ and is called God.' Other Protestant confessions of faith identified the pope as the antichrist, including but not limited to the Morland Confession of 1508 and 1535 (Waldenses) and the Helvetic Confession of 1536 (Switzerland). Today, those that hold such a belief are in the minority. In fact, nowadays it is viewed as radical and uncharitable for a Christian to say that the pope is the antichrist. How did such transformation take place among the Protestant denominations? The change in the position of the Protestant denominations toward Rome was the direct result of a concerted campaign by agents of the Roman Catholic Church. One of the methods used by the Roman Catholic Theologians was to relegate the Book of Revelation to some future time. In 1590 a Roman Catholic Priest Francisco Ribera, in his 500 page commentary on the Book of Revelation, placed the events of the book of Revelation in a period in the future just prior to the end of the world. He claimed the antichrist would be an individual who would not be manifested until very near the end of the world. He wrote that the antichrist would rebuild Jerusalem, abolish Christianity, deny Christ, persecute the church and dominate the world for three and a half years. Another Jesuit, Cardinal Robert Bellarmine, promoted Ribera's teachings. Bellarmine was one of the most intellectual cardinals of his time. In 1930 he was canonized by the Vatican as a saint and 'Doctor of the Church.' This Catholic interpretation of the book of Revelation did not become accepted in the Protestant denominations until a book title The Coming of the Messiah in Glory and Majesty was published in 1812, 11 years after the death of its author. The author of that book was another Jesuit by the name of Emmanuel de Lacunza.

Lacunza's fully developed system played a major role in the Counter-Reformation, the purpose of which was to remove the stigma of Antichrist from Rome, and as such, is a very important work in regard to the history of the Reformation, and the counter-Reformation which followed, which was a reaction to the teaching of Reformers such as Martin Luther and John (Jean) Calvin that the Papacy is the Antichrist of scripture. In Death of the Church Victorious Ovid Need Jr. asserts that although the Jesuits then tried to introduce this system into Protestant theology several times over the next century, they were not successful until Presbyterian Pastor Edward Irving read Lacunza's work under the pseudonym of "Ben Ezra, A Converted Jew" and then translated it into English:

The pressure was on Rome, especially the word of God in the hands of the average person. So in order to turn the blame away from the Papacy, the Roman Catholic Jesuits started teaching that the Antichrist was some future individual that would come at the end of time."

Hendrie continues:

William Kimball, in his book Rapture, A Question of Timing, reveals that Lacunza wrote the book under the pen name of Rabbi Juan Josaphat Ben-Ezra. Kimball attributes the pen name to a motive to conceal his identity, thus taking the heat off of Rome, and making his writings more palatable to Protestant readers.

Hendries's assertion that Lacunza's intent to conceal his identity is supported by Edward Irving's 1827 translation of the book into English, in which the front cover states that the identity of the author is attributed to "Juan Josafat Ben-Ezra, A Converted Jew". The statement on the front cover of the book that depicts the author of the book as "a converted Jew" is not supported by known historical fact, as Lacunza was a Jesuit, and not a Jew.

== Lacunza's ideas and their subsequent effect on the development of Protestant eschatology after the Reformation ==
According to Historicism, the depiction of the "head of gold" in the "Great Image" of Daniel 2 corresponds with the depiction of a "winged lion" of Daniel 7, the "chest of silver" of Daniel 2 corresponds with the "bear which is raised up on one side" in Daniel 7, and the "terrible beast" of Daniel 7 corresponds with the "nondescript beast" power of Revelation 13, verse 1 and 2. Sir Isaac Newton's position on the vision of the "Great Image", or "Metal Man" of Daniel 2 corresponding with the "Four Beasts" of Daniel 7 is typical of the Historcist interpretation of these two chapters of the Book of Daniel:

In the next vision, which is of the four Beasts, the Prophecy of the four Empires [which are depicted in Daniel 2] is repeated …

This view was promoted as early as the 3rd century by theologians Irenaeus of Lyon and Hippolytus of Rome, who at first espoused the underlying principles of Historicism when they traced what they believe to be the succeeding world powers of Babylon, Medo-Persia, Greece and Imperial Rome to their time, and then espoused the underlying principals of Futurism as they speculated on the time, appearance and identity of a future Antichrist, which they believed would arise from the disintegration of the fourth kingdom into ten smaller kingdoms. The following passage, taken from Hippolyus' treatise On Christ And Antichrist and which is germane with Irenaeus' view, demonstrates that he at first employed what later became known as Historicist methods in his exegesis of this passage of Biblical prophecy:

32. Speak with me, O blessed Daniel. Give me full assurance, I beseech thee. Thou dost prophesy concerning the lioness in Babylon; for thou wast a captive there. Thou hast unfolded the future regarding the bear; for thou wast still in the world, and didst see the things come to pass. Then thou speakest to me of the leopard; and whence canst thou know this, for thou art already gone to thy rest? Who instructed thee to announce these things, but He who formed thee in (from) thy mother's womb? That is God, thou sayest. Thou hast spoken indeed, and that not falsely. The leopard has arisen; the he-goat is come; he hath smitten the ram; he hath broken his horns in pieces; he hath stamped upon him with his feet. He has been exalted by his fall; (the) four horns have come up from under that one. Rejoice, blessed Daniel! thou hast not been in error: all these things have come to pass. 33. After this again thou hast told me of the beast dreadful and terrible. "It had iron teeth and claws of brass: it devoured and brake in pieces, and stamped the residue with the feet of it." Already the iron rules; already it subdues and breaks all in pieces; already it brings all the unwilling into subjection; already we see these things ourselves. Now we glorify God, being instructed by thee.

Hippolytus identified the beast "dreadful and terrible" as Imperial Rome, the kingdom that then ruled the known world. The following passage demonstrates that Hippolytus' identification of the Antichrist (which is also germane with Irenaeus' views), then espoused the underlying principles of Futurism, when he identified the last prophetic week of Daniel 9:27 with a future tyrannical Antichrist who will cause "the sacrifice and oblation to cease", at which the prophets Enoch and Elijah will return to preach "clothed in sackcloth", for "1260 days" (three and a half literal years), shortly before the second advent of Christ.

43. With respect, then, to the particular judgment in the torments that are to come upon it in the last times by the hand of the tyrants who shall arise then, the clearest statement has been given in these passages. But it becomes us further diligently to examine and set forth the period at which these things shall come to pass, and how the little horn shall spring up in their midst. For when the legs of iron have issued in the feet and toes, according to the similitude of the image and that of the terrible beast, as has been shown in the above, (then shall be the time) when the iron and the clay shall be mingled together. Now Daniel will set forth this subject to us. For he says, "And one week will make a covenant with many, and it shall be that in the midst (half) of the week my sacrifice and oblation shall cease." By one week, therefore, he meant the last week which is to be at the end of the whole world of which week the two prophets Enoch and Elias will take up the half. For they will preach 1,260 days clothed in sackcloth, proclaiming repentance to the people and to all the nations.

These speculative ideas found within Irenaeus' polemic entitled Against Heresies and Hippolytus' On the Antichrist largely influenced the exegesis which appeared within Lacunza'a book – which in turn served to influence Irving. According to Ovid Need Jr., early in 1823 Irving came into contact with a copy of the 1812 Spanish edition which had been brought into England and given to a parish Priest by a Catholic friend, with the intention of translating the document into English and:

… they would send 'specimens of work' to important Roman churchmen. During the time the men were seeking to get the document into circulation among the Protestants … [Irving stated that] … 'The pages of Ben-Ezra and the substance of my own discourses met together upon the same table in London, on their passages to two different destinations. The truth which he [Ben-Ezra] had been taught in the midst of Catholic superstition, and had written with fear and trembling under the walls of the Vatican, met with the truth which God's Spirit had, during a season of affliction, taught me.' Though Irving knew it was a Roman Catholic document, he was quite excited over Ben-Ezra. It supported the ideas for which others had derided him.

According to Froom, Lacunza differed from the typical interpretation of the "Metal Man" of Daniel 2, which had been given in previous centuries by Irenaeus, Hippolytus and the Reformers, by stating that the kingdoms of Babylon and Persia constituted the head of gold, the Macedonian Empire as the chest and arms of silver, the bronze thighs as Roman, "but the ten toed legs, the Romano-Gothic professedly Christian kingdoms of 'divided' Western Europe." Froom viewed Lacunza's explication of the four beasts of Daniel 7 as "novel and unsatisfactory. Noting the usual explanation of Daniel 7 as paralleling the kingdoms of Daniel 2, with the ten horns as the ten kingdoms, he proposes another explanation. They are construed as four religions—idolatry, Mohammedanism, pseudo-Christianity, and anti-Christian deism, which is already unfolding itself to the world in the French Revolution." His perceptions of the second advent of Christ were largely responsible for the formation of British Premillennialism, which then formed the basis of Futurist Dispensationalism under Anglo-Irish theologian John Nelson Darby, who had access to Irving and further developed Irving's theology. Under Darby, Ben Ezra developed into a comprehensive hermeneutic, in which a literal interpretation is given to theology and eschatology.

Lacunza's developed system was introduced to the European Protestant English world by a Presbyterian Pastor, Edward Irving. It was popularized by a former Anglican, John Nelson Darby. It was systematized by Cyrus Ingerson Scofield (1843–1921). Thus from one man, Lacunza, the system became the standard for Christian thought for many generations … The influence of the Plymouth Brethren (who adapted the system, c. 1830) upon Christianity after the late 1800s is readily apparent as one reads later Baptist creeds, confessions and messages … While many good, sincere people claim to be Christians of various stripes (Baptist, Presbyterian, Pentecostal &c.), in reality they cling tenaciously to a common system having deep roots in Ben-Ezra. Though the view had been offered several times before, the successful offering was a 1790 manuscript published by Rome in 1812. In 1827, it was translated and published in English by Edward Irving. To Lacunza's basic system, Irving added a 'pre-trib rapture,' an idea he may have obtained from a Scottish lass, Margaret Macdonald. However, it was under Darby's name (Darbyism) and skillful guidance that the system spread over the whole earth. It became the foundation for the Plymouth Brethrenism. In the early 1900s, it was codified by Scofield. Irving's system was adapted by various denominations with only minor differences among them.

It was at the Powerscourt Conferences, which were sponsored by the wealthy widow Lady Powerscourt after she had attended the earlier Albury Park Conferences and had been impressed by Edward Irving's speaking, that Darby first met Edward Irving.

Though Darby was not among those attending the [earlier] Albury meetings, he later claimed as his own many of the conclusions reached at Albury Park. Certainly, by the time the Albury meetings were concluded, Irving had well perfected the new Ben-Ezra ideas when he took it to the 1833 Powerscourt conference – the loose ends were tied together … We should mention that Darby answered the question, 'Is there a prospect of a revival of Apostolic churches before the coming of Christ?' … Powerscourt saw the teaching of a pretribulation rapture introduced. It developed into its full bloom at these meetings … Though others e.g. Irving offered a secret rapture idea, its origin has since been attributed to Darby by most scholars.

It is at the Albury Conferences in 1830, shortly before the Powerscourt Conferences, where speaking in tongues is first recorded as taking place, which forms another aspect of Dispensationalist theology.

Irving, was also the first to have tongues in his congregation … Irving permitted the "miraculous gifts" at his Presbyterian Church, causing the elders to excommunicate him and lock him out. He then formed his Catholic Apostolic Church down the street in 1831.

Darby strenuously resisted speaking in tongues, and regarded them as "devilish":

Darby nevertheless accepted most of Irving's ideas, including the new millennial view of Daniel's 70th week and a personal Antichrist, he stoutly resisted Irving's tongues, calling them 'devilish', and Irving lost his influence.

Dispensationalism became popular within Protestant churches very early in the 20th century, when in 1909 C.I. Scofield published the Scofield Bible. The Scofield Bible was a reference Bible which had notes that teach Premillennialism and the Futurist system of prophetic interpretation inserted into the popular King James Version of the Bible. The Scofield Bible quickly became widely influential among fundamentalist Christians within the United States and most other countries, as these notes became a significant source for popular religious writers such as Hal Lindsey, who was the author of the best-selling book The Late, Great Planet Earth, first published in 1970. Thus the transmission of ideas from Irenaeus and Hippolytus to Lacunza, Irving, Darby and Scofield were largely responsible for removing the stigma of Antichrist which the Reformers had applied to the Papacy.

The 'time' prophecy which is largely responsible for this, is the Dispensationalist view of the prophetic 70 'weeks' of Daniel chapter 9, as it incorporates Lacunza's ideas of a future Jewish Antichrist decimating the entire earth in three and a half years of tribulation. While the Reformers believed that much of verse 26 and 27 refers to fulfilled prophecy which applies to Christ, the majority of Protestant churches now teach that most of the Seventy prophetic 'weeks' of Daniel remains largely unfulfilled and will be fulfilled sometime in an indefinite future. Only the first three chapters of the Book of Revelation have been fulfilled, with the rest of this book being hurled far into an indefinite future - hence the name Futurism. The Book of Daniel is treated in a similar manner, as in Futurism:

"The prophetic clock stopped ticking with the death of Jesus on the cross (end of the 69th week) and will commence again when the Antichrist leads a great army against the people of God."

Thus all prophecy that is related to verse 27 of the Seventy prophetic `weeks' of Daniel and all prophecy that is depicted after the third and fourth chapters of the Book of Revelation is relegated to a fully restored literal Israel, for in this mode of prophetic interpretation, Israel is regarded as `God's Prophetic Clock'and the Church has nothing at all to do with prophecy.

"One of the foundational innovations of the Protestant futurist school has been the introduction of a "church age parenthesis" into the time prophecy of the Seventy Weeks of Daniel 9. This results in postponing the seventieth week until the end of time. This is understood in terms of a future antichrist and a future tribulation."

As Need states:

And so, through ideas gleaned from Irving by the writings of Lacunza, and … then subsequently claimed by Darby as his own discovery, the war of the millenarians against the Papacy was defused. For if a personal Antichrist must come after a secret rapture, how could the present papacy be the Antichrist, as historically claimed by the Protestants?

== Chronicler of Exile and Persecution ==
Lacunza's various works are valuable as a record of the experience of exile and intellectual persecution which results from religious belief. His personal letters have come to be highly valued in his birthplace of Chile owing to its recent history of exile and persecution. For example, he wrote of his fellow exiles: "Everybody looks at us as at a tree totally dry, incapable of reviving or as a corpse buried in oblivion."

The longing of the exile for his homeland can be heard in his declaration, "Only those, who have lost it know what Chile is. There isn't compensation here, and that is the pure truth." Nevertheless, he saw his work as giving him the strength to overcome the longing he had for his homeland, and was able to rejoice in his suffering for Christ. "Because to serve God in truth, there cannot be anything with an better purpose than the present state in which we find ourselves, that is of humiliation and of carrying our cross."

Lacunza's The Coming of the Messiah in Majesty and Glory is particularly valuable as it presents two Jesuit views which contributed to the counter-Reformation, with Ribera's view being generally accepted by most Protestant churches today – the only Protestant church which still officially adheres to the Historicist mode of prophetic interpretation is the Seventh-day Adventist church.

‘Historicism, once the dominant view of Protestants from the Reformation until the middle of the last [19th] century, appears to exert little attraction as a system of prophetic interpretation to conservative Christians (outside of Seventh-Day Adventist circles) … Within evangelicalism during the last one hundred fifty years, futurism has grown to dominate and overcome historicism.’

== Editions of Lacunza's book ==
- Lacunza, Manuel (1827a). The Coming of Messiah in Glory and Majesty. Vol. 1. Edward Irving (Translator). London: L. B. Seeley and Son. ISBN 9780371903902.
- Lacunza, Manuel (1827b). The Coming of Messiah in Glory and Majesty. Vol. 2. Edward Irving (Translator). London: L. B. Seeley and Son.
- Lacunza, Manuel (December 2000a). The Coming of Messiah in Glory and Majesty (PDF). Vol. 1. Edward Irving (Translator). Belper, England: Jonathan G. Tillin.
- Lacunza, Manuel (December 2000b). The Coming of Messiah in Glory and Majesty (PDF). Vol. 2. Edward Irving (Translator). Belper, England: Jonathan G. Tillin.

== Bibliography ==
- Daneri, Juan J. 2005. Escatología y política jesuitas. La profecía del fin de los tiempos según Manuel Lacunza. (Jesuit Eschatology and Politics: The Prophecy of the end of time by Manuel Lacunza) Mapocho (Biblioteca Nacional de Chile) 58:181-201.
- Daneri, Juan J. 2000. Los usos de la profecía. Escatología y política en 'La venida del Mesías en gloria y magestad' (1812) de Manuel Lacunza. (The uses of prophecy: Eschatology and Politics in 'The Coming of the Messiah in Glory and Majesty' (1812) of Manuel Lacunza) Silabario, Revista de Estudios y Ensayos Geoculturales (Universidad Nacional de Córdoba) 3.3:91-100.
