= Benjamin Way =

English politician

Benjamin Way (1740–1808) of Denham Place was an English politician, Member of Parliament for Bridport in 1765.

The son of Lewis Way F.R.S., director of the South Sea Company by his third wife Abigail, he matriculated at Christ Church, Oxford in 1758. He was a Fellow of the Royal Society, elected 1771, and of the Society of Antiquaries of London. He acted as High Sheriff of Buckinghamshire in 1777; was President of Guy's Hospital; and was Sub-Governor of the South Sea Company.

He was commissioned as Lieutenant-Colonel and second in command of the Royal Buckinghamshire Militia (King's Own) in 1794, and was in command of the battalion at Chelmsford Barracks during the 'invasion summer' of 1805.

== Family ==
By his wife Elizabeth Anne, daughter of William Cooke, Provost of King's College, Cambridge, he had seven sons and nine daughters. Lewis Way was the second son. Gregory Holman Bromley Way was the fifth son. His daughter Catherine married Sir Montague Cholmeley, 1st Bt. (b. 20 Mar 1772, d. 10 Mar 1831).
