= Kennaway baronets =

Title in the Baronetage of Great Britain

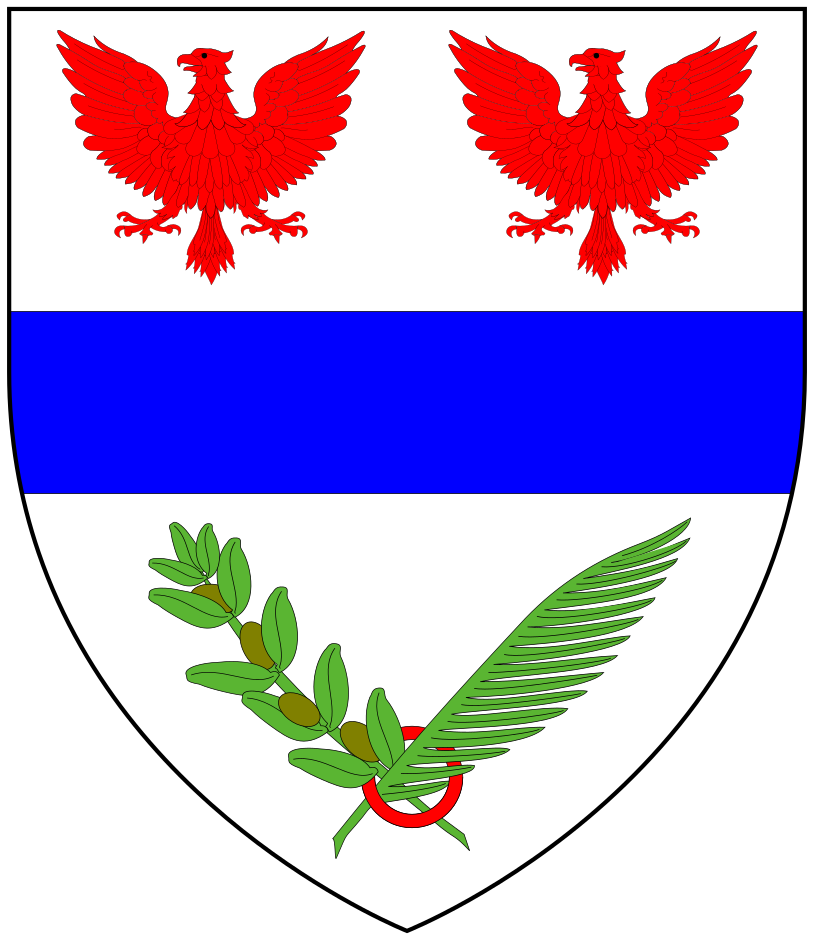
Arms of Kennaway: Argent, a fess azure between two eagles displayed in chief gules and in base through an annulet of the third a slip of olive and another of palm in saltire proper

The Kennaway Baronetcy of Hyderabad in the East Indies, is a title in the Baronetage of Great Britain. It was created on 25 February 1791 for John Kennaway (1758–1836), British Resident at the Court of Nizam Ali Khan, Asaf Jah II, Nizam of Hyderabad, in recognition of his part in the negotiation of the 1790 alliance between the Nizam and the East India Company against Tipoo Sultan.

The 2nd Baronet was High Sheriff of Devon in 1866. The 3rd Baronet was a Member of Parliament for East Devon from 1870 to 1885 Honiton from 1885 to 1910.

The Kennaway family originated in Fifeshire, Scotland; the 1st Baronet's father William Kennaway was a merchant in Exeter, who died in 1793. The 1st Baronet bought in 1794 the Escot House estate in the parish of Talaton, near Ottery St Mary, Devon. The Kennaway family motto is Ascendam ("I will rise").

== Kennaway baronets of Hyderabad (1791) ==
- Sir John Kennaway, 1st Baronet (1758–1836)
- Sir John Kennaway, 2nd Baronet (1797–1873)
- Sir John Henry Kennaway, 3rd Baronet (1837–1919)
- Sir John Kennaway, 4th Baronet (1879–1956)
- Sir John Lawrence Kennaway, 5th Baronet (1933–2017)
- Sir John-Michael Kennaway, 6th Baronet (born 1962)

Baronetage of Great Britain
Preceded by Malet baronets	Kennaway baronets of Hyderabad; 25 February 1791	Succeeded by Lushington baronets
