= Baptist Wriothesley Noel =

English Baptist clergyman (1798–1873)

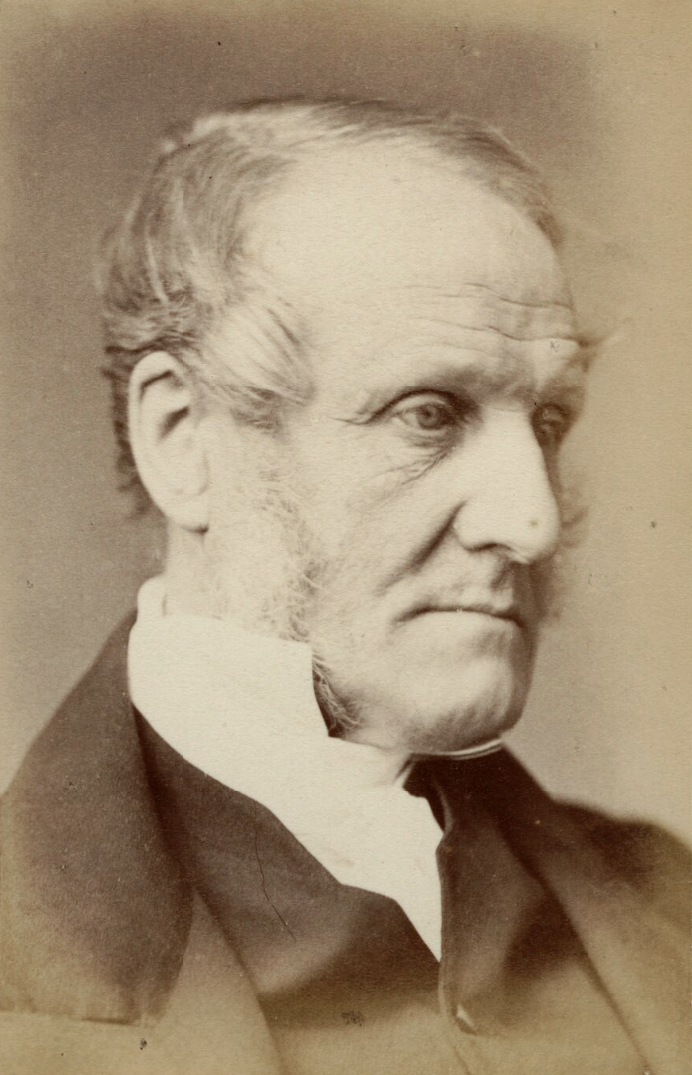
Baptist Wriothesley Noel

The Reverend The Honourable Baptist Wriothesley Noel (/ˈraɪəθsli/ REYE-əths-lee; 16 July 1798 – 19 January 1873) was an English Baptist minister. He was minister of St John's Chapel, Bedford Row, London, from 1827 to 1848, In 1849 he became pastor of the nearby John Street Baptist Church in Bloomsbury, following the death of the former pastor, James Harington Evans. Noel twice served as President of the Baptist Union of Great Britain. A portrait of him hangs outside the library of Regent's Park College, Oxford.

== Family ==
Noel was born in the Leith district of Edinburgh. His baptism is recorded as taking place at the North Leith parish church on 7 August 1798. He was the tenth son and sixteenth of eighteen children born to Sir Gerard Noel and Diana, Baroness Barham. Lady Diana was a devout evangelical whose faith strongly influenced her children. Noel attended Westminster School and Trinity College, Cambridge before entering the Middle Temple to become a barrister. In 1817 he became the uncle of Caroline Marie Noel, a future successful hymn writer.

=== Anglican Ministry ===
In 1824, the year his mother died, he became an Anglican cleric. He rapidly became a leader of the Evangelical party, being appointed to one of the most prominent Evangelical Anglican churches in London (St. John's, Bedford Row), only three years after his ordination. Noel published some eighty books and pamphlets in his lifetime, chiefly concerned either with social and political reform, or with evangelical beliefs and attitudes, or with the nature of the Christian Church as a spiritual fellowship embracing all true believers.

On 17 October 1826, Noel married Jane Baillie of Dochfour, whose distinguished family was descended from John de Balliol, founder of Balliol College, Oxford. Their eight children (four sons and four daughters) included the MP and businessman Ernest Noel (1831-1931). In 1837 Mary Jane Kinnaird who was his niece became his de facto secretary. She helped him but also established her own projects. She formed the St John's Training School for Domestic Servants in 1841. Another pet project was to help fund a Calvin memorial hall in Geneva. She and Baptist wanted to evangelize in Europe. They were visited several times by both the Swiss minister Jean-Henri Merle d'Aubigné and the French minister Frédéric Monod. This ended in 1841 when she married Arthur Fitzgerald Kinnaird who was the tenth Lord Kinnaird of Inchture and the second Baron Kinnaird of Rossie in 1843.

In 1845, the founding of the Young Men's Christian Association led him to reflect on another form of Christian life, nonconformism. That same year, when Robert Peel's government refused to fund the building of churches in Scotland and England, while granting an increase in the annual subsidy to the Catholic seminary of Maynooth in Ireland, Noel speaks out against the inconsistency of Parliament. A few months later, he went to Switzerland to better understand a Christian secession movement advocating the separation of church and state. In 1848, in Essay on the Union of Church and State, written before his resignation and published after his departure, he demonstrated the importance of the separation between Church and State. Before his resignation, he also published a commentary presenting baptismal regeneration (pedobaptism) as contrary to evangelical teaching. Members of the congregation of St John's sensing the departure of their pastor, tried to meet the queen for a reform of the liturgy and thus keep their pastor.

In November, during Sunday service, he announced his intention to secede from the Anglican Church next Sunday. This announcement was picked up by the press and his bishop banned him from preaching after this Sunday in question. He was thus forced to resign.

=== Baptist Ministry ===
After his resignation, he kept his distance from the media and took a period of spiritual retreat. He did, however, speak at YMCA meetings at Exeter Hall.

In 1849 he was baptized by immersion and joined John Street Baptist Chapel. A few months later, he received an offer for a co-pastor position. He became senior pastor of the church in March 1850. He was twice elected president of the Baptist Union of Great Britain.

Baptist Noel retired from active ministry in 1868 and spent his remaining years at Stanmore, Middlesex.

== Bibliography ==
- David Bebbington: 'The Life of Baptist Noel: Its Setting and Significance' in Baptist Quarterly Vol.XXIV No.8, October 1972
- Grayson Carter: Anglican Evangelicals: Protestant Secessions from the Via Media c.1800-1850 (Oxford: OUP, 2001) ISBN 0-19-827008-9
- Gerard Noel: Sir Gerard Noel, MP, and the Noels of Chipping Campden and Exton (Chipping Campden & District Historical Society, 2004) ISBN 0-9511434-9-2
- Philip D. Hill: A Rebel Saint. Baptist Wriothesley Noel, 1798-1873 (Cambridge: James Clarke, 2022) ISBN 9780227177617
