= Lewis Way =

English barrister and churchman

Lewis Way (1772–1840) was an English barrister and churchman, noted for his Christian outreach to Jews. He is not to be confused with his grandfather, also called Lewis Way, a director of the South Sea Company.

== Life ==
Lewis Way was born on 11 February, 1772, as the second son of Benjamin Way (1740–1808) of Denham, Buckinghamshire. Benjamin Way was an MP and a Fellow of the Royal Society, and arranged for his son's education as a barrister. Way graduated M.A. in 1796 from Merton College, Oxford, and in 1797 was called to the bar by the Society of the Inner Temple.

Way came upon a stroke of good fortune in October 1799. A wealthy man named John Way (1732–1804) was at the Inner Temple to adjust his will; he stopped by Lewis Way's office, curious to meet the person who shared his unusual last name. While the two Ways were not related, they did establish a friendship and correspondence. Lewis visited John at his home, and John provided financial support for Lewis. John Way did not have any children of his own, and he adjusted his will such that his estate of around £300,000 (= around £32 million pounds in 2021, adjusted for inflation) went to Lewis, after setting aside some for his wife. John Way died in 1804, and Lewis Way was suddenly independently wealthy and no longer needed to support himself as a barrister. He became a philanthropist instead.

Way was ordained a priest of the Church of England in 1817, and devoted much of his wealth to religious works. On his way to Lebanon in 1823, he stayed for a while in Nice, on the Mediterranean coast in what is now France. While there, he donated funds for the construction of the seaside Promenade des Anglais. In Lebanon, he met the traveller Lady Hester Stanhope. He later lived in Paris as the chaplain to the British ambassador. He founded the Marbeuf Chapel near the Champs-Élysées in 1824, where his preaching attracted a fashionable congregation. This church has moved buildings and is now St George's Paris.

Lewis Way's last years were spent in rural Warwickshire in the care of a lunatic asylum at Barford. He died on 23 January 1840.

== Mission to the Jewish people ==
Way belonged to the Evangelical wing of the Church of England and was active in its outreach to Jewish people. He was a founding member of the London Society for Promoting Christianity Amongst the Jews. In 1812–16, he built the chapel at Stansted Park, Sussex, as part of this ministry. Way firmly believed that the restoration of the Jews to Israel would fulfill Biblically-mandated prophecies, and believed that this would be linked with the mass conversion of the Jews to Christianity.

In 1817, Way travelled to Russia, stopping in the Netherlands, Germany, and Poland along the way to visit Jewish populations and worship sites. He obtained four audiences with Tsar Alexander I of Russia, who befriended him and shared his interest in the future of the Jewish people (see History of the Jews in Russia). Way wrote, "It was not an audience of a private man with an Emperor, but rather a most friendly exchange of views of a Christian with a fellow Christian." The Tsar sent Way to the Congress of Aix-la-Chapelle (1818) in what is now Aachen in Germany to obtain a commitment from the post-Napoleonic European heads of state to improve the lot of Europe's Jewish population.

It was following his visit to Russia in 1817 that Lewis Way developed a belief in the imminent return of Christ, adopting the pseudonym 'Basilicus' for the publication of his convictions in Thoughts on the Scriptural Expectations of the Christian Church. He also pursued the idea of creating a college at Stansted Park to train missionaries to the Jews, but the plans never came through.

== Family ==
In 1801 Way married Mary Drewe (1780–1848), youngest daughter of the Reverend Herman Drewe of The Grange, Broadhembury, a substantial estate in Devon. The couple had nine children: three sons and six daughters. These included the antiquary Albert Way (1805–1874), Georgiana Millicent Way, who married Henry Daniel Cholmeley (b. 1810, d. 1 Jun 1865), and Olive who married Rev. Charles Edward Kennaway, the Anglican clergyman and poet.
