= List of statutory instruments of the United Kingdom, 2011 =

This is a complete list of all 3,131 statutory instruments of the United Kingdom in 2011.

== 1–100 ==
- Cornwall (Electoral Changes) Order 2011 (SI 2011/1)
- Northumberland (Electoral Changes) Order 2011 (SI 2011/2)
- Cheshire East (Electoral Changes) Order 2011 (SI 2011/3)
- Cheshire West and Chester (Electoral Changes) Order 2011 (SI 2011/4)
- The A458 Trunk Road (Cwm Dugoed, Gwynedd) (Temporary Prohibition of Vehicles) Order (SI 2011/5)
- The M4 Motorway (Junction 44, Lon-Las, Morriston, Swansea) (Temporary Prohibition of Vehicles) Order (SI 2011/6)
- The A48(M) Motorway (St Mellons, Cardiff) (Temporary 50 MPH Speed Limit) Order (SI 2011/7)
- The A40/A449 Trunk Road (Raglan Interchange, Monmouthshire (Temporary Prohibition of Vehicles and Cyclists) Order (SI 2011/8)
- The Air Navigation (Restriction of Flying) (Ford Prison) Regulations (SI 2011/9)
- The Air Navigation (Restriction of Flying) (Ford Prison) (Revocation) Regulations (SI 2011/10)
- The Consumer Credit (Amendment) Regulations (SI 2011/11)
- The M4 Motorway (Brynglas Tunnels, Newport) (Temporary Traffic Restriction & Prohibitions) Order (SI 2011/12)
- The A55 Trunk Road (Conwy Tunnel, Conwy) (Temporary Traffic Restriction & Prohibitions) Order (SI 2011/13)
- The Water Supply (Water Quality) (Amendment) Regulations 2011 (SI 2011/14)
- The A55 Trunk Road (Eastbound Exit Slip Road at Junction 10 (Caernarfon Road Interchange), Gwynedd) (Temporary Prohibition of Vehicles) Order (SI 2011/15)
- The M4 Motorway (Junction 42 (Earlswood), Neath Port Talbot) (Temporary Prohibition of Vehicles & Trafficking of Hard Shoulders) Order (SI 2011/16)
- The A40 Trunk Road (Westbound Carriageway Between Raglan Roundabout and Hardwick Gyratory, Monmouthshire) (Temporary Prohibition of Vehicles & Cyclists) Order (SI 2011/17)
- The A48 Trunk Road & M4 Motorway (River Neath Bridge & Briton Ferry Dock Viaduct, Neath Port Talbot) (Temporary Traffic Restrictions & Prohibitions) Order (SI 2011/18)
- The Road Safety Act 2006 (Commencement 6) Order (SI 2011/19)
- The Motor Vehicles (Insurance Requirements) Regulations (SI 2011/20)
- The Value Added Tax (Payments on Account) (Amendment) Order (SI 2011/21)
- The Dormant Bank and Building Society Accounts (Tax) Regulations (SI 2011/22)
- The Finance Act 2008, Section 39(7) (Commencement) Order (SI 2011/23)
- The A458 Trunk Road (Cefn Railway Bridge, Buttington, Powys) (Temporary Prohibition of Vehicles) Order (SI 2011/24)
- The M25 Motorway (Junctions 18 – 24) (Temporary Restriction and Prohibition of Traffic) Order (SI 2011/25)
- The A38 Trunk Road (Carkeel Roundabout to Saltash Tunnel, Cornwall) (Temporary Prohibition of Traffic) Order (SI 2011/26)
- The A38 Trunk Road (Burton upon Trent, Staffordshire) (Temporary 50 Miles Per Hour Speed Limit) Order (SI 2011/27)
- The M1 Motorway (Junctions 23 to 23a) (Temporary Restriction and Prohibition of Traffic) Order (SI 2011/28)
- The A5 Trunk Road (Towcester, Northamptonshire) (Temporary Prohibition of Traffic) Order (SI 2011/29)
- The M6 Motorway (Junction 14, Staffordshire) (Slip Roads) (Temporary Prohibition of Traffic) Order (SI 2011/30)
- The A12 and A120 Trunk Roads (Crown Interchange Junction 29, Colchester, Essex) (Temporary Restriction and Prohibition of Traffic) Order (SI 2011/31)
- The A38 Trunk Road (Palm Court Roundabout, Derby) (Temporary Prohibition of Traffic) Order (SI 2011/32)
- The M1 Motorway (Junction 22) (Temporary Restriction and Prohibition of Traffic) Order (SI 2011/33)
- The A5 Trunk Road (Church Street to Queensway, High Street North, Dunstable) Northbouind (Temporary Prohibition of Traffic) Order (SI 2011/34)
- The A1 (M) Motorway and A1 Trunk Road (A507 Roundabout, Stotfold to Biggleswade South Roundabout, Bedfordshire) (Temporary Prohibition of Traffic) Order (SI 2011/35)
- The A12 Trunk Road (Junction 32A to Pound Lane, Capel St Mary, Suffolk (Temporary Restriction and Prohibition of Traffic) Order (SI 2011/36)
- The Mutual Societies (Transfers of Business) (Tax) (Amendment) Regulations (SI 2011/37)
- The Smoke Control Areas (Exempted Fireplaces) (Wales) Order 2011 (SI 2011/38)
- The A470 Trunk Road (Taffs Well to Nantgarw, Rhondda Cynon Taf) (Temporary 50 MPH Speed Limit) Order (SI 2011/39)
- The A4232 Trunk Road (Capel Llanilltern to Culverhouse Cross, Cardiff) (Temporary Prohibition of Vehicles) Order (SI 2011/40)
- The River Mersey (Mersey Gateway Bridge) Order (SI 2011/41)
- The M6 Motorway (Junction 26) (Orrell Interchange) and M58 Motorway (Temporary Prohibition of Traffic) Order (SI 2011/42)
- The M4 Motorway (Eastbound Exit Slip Road at Junction 46 (Llangyfelach), Swansea) (Temporary Prohibition of Vehicles) Order (SI 2011/43)
- The A1 (M) Motorway (Junction 64 to Junction 63) (Temporary 50 miles per Hour Speed Restriction) Order (SI 2011/44)
- The M11 Motorway (Harlow Interchange Junction 7 to Birchanger Interchange Junction 8, Essex) (Temporary Restriction and Prohibition of Traffic) Order (SI 2011/45)
- The Constitutional Reform and Governance Act 2010 (Commencement 4 and Saving Provision) Order (SI 2011/46)
- The M6 Motorway (Junction 22, Northbound and Southbound Exit and Entry Slip Roads) (Temporary Prohibition of Traffic) Order (SI 2011/47)
- The A66 Trunk Road (Flitholme Bridge) (Temporary Restriction of Traffic) Order (SI 2011/48)
- The A14 Trunk Road (Felixstowe Dock No.1 Roundabout, Suffolk (Prohibition of Waiting) Order (SI 2011/49)
- The A19 Trunk Road (Stockton Road Interchange to Portrack Interchange) (Temporary Prohibition of Traffic) Order (SI 2011/50)
- The A19 Trunk Road (Burnhope Way Interchange, Peterlee) (Temporary Prohibition of Traffic) Order (SI 2011/51)
- The M1 Motorway (Junction 44 and Junction 45) (Temporary Restriction and Prohibition of Traffic Order) (SI 2011/52)
- The A1 Motorway (Junction 44 to Junction 45) (Temporary Prohibition of Traffic) Order (SI 2011/53)
- The Public Lending Right Scheme 1982 (Commencement of Variation) Order (SI 2011/54)
- The M4 Motorway (Junctions 19–18) (Temporary Restriction of Traffic) Order (SI 2011/55)
- The M5 Motorway (Junction 20 Southbound Entry Slip Road) (Temporary Prohibition of Traffic) Order (SI 2011/56)
- The Barnet, Enfield and Haringey Mental Health National Health Service Trust (Establishment) Amendment Order (SI 2011/57)
- The A5 Trunk Road (Milton Keynes) (De-Restriction) Order (SI 2011/58)
- The A40 and the A449 Trunk Roads (Welsh Border to Traveller's Rest Roundabout, Ross-on-Wye) (24 Hours Clearway) Order (SI 2011/59)
- The A19 Trunk Road (Moor Farm to Seaton Burn and Holystone Interchange) (Temporary Restriction and Prohibition of Traffic) Order (SI 2011/60)
- The A2 Trunk Road (Brenley Corner – Nackington) (Temporary Restriction and Prohibition of Traffic) Order (SI 2011/61)
- The M25 Motorway (Junction 8, Slip Roads) (Temporary Prohibition of Traffic) Order (SI 2011/62)
- The M4 Motorway (Junction 10, Link Roads) (Temporary Prohibition of Traffic) Order (SI 2011/63)
- The A31 Trunk Road (Beri Regis Roundabout – Roundhouse Roundabout) (Temporary Prohibition of Traffic) Order (SI 2011/64)
- The A303 Trunk Road (Longparish Interchange – Barton Stacey Inerchange) (Temporary Restriction and Prohibition of Traffic) Order (SI 2011/65)
- The A1 (M) Motorway (Junction 8, Stevenage, Hertfordshire) Northbound Entry Slip Road (Temporary Prohibition of Traffic) Order (SI 2011/66)
- The A259 Trunk Road (Guestling Green) (Temporary Restriction and Prohibition of Traffic) Order (SI 2011/67)
- The A30 Trunk Road, the A316 Trunk Road and the M3 Motorway (M25 Junction 13 to the A308, M3 at Junction 2 and Park Road to M3 Junction 1) (Temporary Prohibition of Traffic) Order (SI 2011/68)
- The A55 Trunk Road (Junction 8A Eastbound On Slip Road, Carreg Bran, Britannia Bridge, Isle of Anglesey) (Temporary Prohibition of Vehicles) Order (SI 2011/69)
- The Rail Vehicle Accessibility (Non-Interoperable Rail System) (London Underground Metropolitan Line S8 Vehicles) Exemption Order (SI 2011/70)
- Shrewsbury (Kingsland) Bridge (Revision of Tolls) Order 2011 (SI 2011/71)
- The M20 Motorway (Junction 1, Slip/Link Roads) (Temporary Prohibition of Traffic) Order (SI 2011/72)
- The A5036 Trunk Road (Temporary Restriction of Traffic) Order (SI 2011/73)
- The A21 Trunk Road (Morley's Interchange – Pembury Road Interchange, Slip Roads) (Temporary Prohibition of Traffic) Order (SI 2011/74)
- The M25 Motorway and the A1(M) Motorway (M25 Junctions 20, 23 and 24, Slip Roads) (Temporary Prohibition of Traffic) Order (SI 2011/75)
- The M25 Motorway (Junction 9, Exit Slip Roads) (Temporary Prohibition of Traffic) Order (SI 2011/76)
- The M25 Motorway (Junction 14 and Terminal 5, Slip/Link Roads) (Temporary Prohibition of Traffic) Order (SI 2011/77)
- The A36 Trunk Road (Wilton, Near Salisbury) (Temporary Prohibition of Pedestrians) Order (SI 2011/78)
- The M5 Motorway (Junctions 28–30) (Temporary Prohibition of Traffic) Order (SI 2011/79)
- The A303 Trunk Road (Countess Roundabout, Near Amesbury, Wiltshire) (Temporary Prohibition and Restriction of Traffic) Order (SI 2011/80)
- The A38 Trunk Road (Linhay Junction, Ashburton) (Temporary Prohibition of Traffic) Order (SI 2011/81)
- The A4 Trunk Road (Portway Roundabout) and M5 Motorway (Junction 18 Slip Roads) (Temporary Prohibition and Restriction of Traffic) Order (SI 2011/82)
- The Education (Student Support) (European University Institute) Regulations 2010 (Amendment) Regulations (SI 2011/83)
- The Lynn and Inner Dowsing Offshore Wind Farms (Amendment) Order (SI 2011/84)
- The A30 Trunk Road (Woodleigh Junction Eastbound Exit Slip Road, Near Cheriton Bishop, Devon) (Temporary Prohibition of Traffic) Order (SI 2011/85)
- The Value Added Tax (Buildings and Land) Order (SI 2011/86)
- The Education (Student Fees, Awards and Support) (Amendment) Regulations (SI 2011/87)
- The Civil Procedure (Amendment) Rules 2011 (SI 2011/88)
- The A1(M) Motorway (Junction 42 to Junction 43 and Junction 44) and the A64 Trunk Road (Temporary Prohibition of Traffic) Order (SI 2011/89)
- The M18 Motorway and the M180 Motorway (North Ings Roundabout) (Temporary Restriction and Prohibition of Traffic) Order (SI 2011/90)
- The A12 Trunk Road (Junction 32B, Bentley Longwood Interchange, Suffolk) (Prohibition of Entry) Order (SI 2011/91)
- The M1 Motorway (Junctions 24 – 23a) (Temporary Restriction and Prohibition of Traffic) Order (SI 2011/92)
- The A55 Trunk Road (Britannia Bridge, Gwynedd and Isle of Anglesey) (Temporary Traffic Restrictions & Prohibitions) Order (SI 2011/93)
- The M4 Motorway (West of Junction 23A (Magor) to East of Junction 29 (Castleton)) (Variable Speed Limits) Regulations (SI 2011/94)
- The Flood and Water Management Act 2010 (Commencement 2) Order 2011 (SI 2011/95)
- The Equality Act 2010 (Commencement 5) Order 2011 (SI 2011/96)
- The Learning and Skills (Wales) Measure 2009 (Commencement No 2) Order (SI 2011/97)
- The Post Office Network Subsidy Scheme (Amendment) Order (SI 2011/98)
- The Electronic Money Regulations (SI 2011/99)
- The Social Fund Maternity Grant Amendment Regulations (SI 2011/ 100)

== 101–200 ==
- The Planning and Compulsory Purchase Act 2004 (Commencement No 4 and Consequential, Transitional and Savings Provisions) (Wales) (Amendment) Order (SI 2011/101)
- The A40 Trunk Road (West of Canaston Bridge, Near Narberth, Pembrokeshire) (Temporary Traffic Restrictions) Order (SI 2011/102)
- The A4042 Trunk Road (Llantarnam Bypass, Torfaen) (Temporary Prohibition of Vehicles) Order (SI 2011/103)
- The A5 Trunk Road (Weedon to Towcester, Northamptonshire) (Temporary Restriction and Prohibition of Traffic) Order (SI 2011/104)
- The Care Standards Act 2000 (Notification) (Wales) Regulations (SI 2011/105)
- The Independent Health Care (Fees) (Wales) Regulations (SI 2011/106)
- The Education (Local Curriculum for Students Aged 16 to 18) (Wales) Regulations (SI 2011/107)
- The Terrorism Act 2000 (Proscribed Organisations) (Amendment) Order (SI 2011/108)
- The Air Navigation (Restriction of Flying) (Clifton) Regulations (SI 2011/109)
- The M4 Motorway (Junction 32, Coryton Interchange, Cardiff) (Temporary Prohibition of Vehicles) Order (SI 2011/110)
- The A4060 & A465 Trunk Roads (Dowlais Top, Merthyr Tydfil) (Temporary Traffic Restrictions & Prohibitions) Order (SI 2011/111)
- The M4 Motorway (Junction 24, Coldra Interchange to Junction 23a Magor, Newport) (Temporary Prohibitions and Restrictions) Order (SI 2011/112)
- The Non-Domestic Rating (Collection and Enforcement) (Local Lists) (Amendment) (England) Regulations (SI 2011/113)
- The A1 (M) Motorway (Junction 61 to Junction 60) (Temporary Restriction and Prohibition of Traffic) Order (SI 2011/114)
- The A1 Trunk Road (Kenton Bar Interchange to Denton Burn Interchange) (Temporary Restriction and Prohibition of Traffic) Order (SI 2011/115)
- The M65 Motorway (Junction 8 Roundabout and Slip Roads) and the A56 Trunk Road (Temporary Prohibition of Traffic) Order (SI 2011/116)
- The A27 Trunk Road (Eastern Road Interchange, Westbound Carriageway) (Temporary Prohibition of Traffic) Order (SI 2011/117)
- The A303 Trunk Road (Micheldever Junction, Westbound) (Temporary Restriction and Prohibition of Traffic) Order (SI 2011/118)
- The Air Navigation (Restriction of Flying) (Clifton) (Revocation) Regulations (SI 2011/119)
- The A5 Trunk Road (Halfway Bridge to Bethesda, Gwynedd) (Temporary 40 mph Speed Limit) Order (SI 2011/120)
- The A34 Trunk Road (Botley Interchange, Northbound Entry Slip Road) (Temporary Prohibition of Traffic) Order (SI 2011/121)
- The Legal Services Act 2007 (Disclosure of Restricted Information) Order (SI 2011/122)
- The A14 Trunk Road (Claydon Interchange Junction 52 to Pesthouse Lane Overbridge, Barham, Suffolk) Westbound (Temporary Restriction and Prohibition of Traffic) Order (SI 2011/123)
- The M11 Motorway (Junction 8 to Junction 8a) and the A120 Trunk Road (Priory Wood Roundabout) (Stansted, Essex) (Temporary Restriction and Prohibition of Traffic) Order (SI 2011/124)
- The A14 Trunk Road (Junction 37, Exning, Suffolk) Westbound Entry Slip Road) (Temporary Prohibition of Traffic) Order (SI 2011/125)
- The A1 Trunk Road (Barnsdale Bar Interchange) (Temporary Restriction and Prohibition of Traffic) Order (SI 2011/126)
- The M1 Motorway (North of Junction 14, Milton Keynes) (Temporary 50 Miles Per Hour Speed Restriction) Order (SI 2011/127)
- The A1 (M) Motorway (Letchworth Road Bridge, Hertfordshire) Northbound (Temporary 50 Miles Per Hour Speed Restriction) Order (SI 2011/128)
- The A3 Trunk Road (Hazel Grove Junction – Hammer Lane) (Temporary Prohibition of Traffic) Order (SI 2011/129)
- The A27 Trunk Road (Wade Lane – Broad marsh Interchange, Westbound) (Temporary Restriction and Prohibition of Traffic) Order (SI 2011/130)
- The A470, A40 & A479 Trunk Roads (Cefn Coed-y-Cymer, Merthyr Tydfil to Cwmbach, Powys) (Temporary Prohibition of Vehicles and Pedestrians) Order (SI 2011/131)
- The Finance ( 3) Act 2010, Schedule 11 (Appointed Day) Order (SI 2011/132)
- The Financial Services and Markets Act 2000 (Regulated Activities) (Amendment) Order (SI 2011/133)
- The Nuclear Decommissioning and Waste Handling (Finance and Fees) Regulations (SI 2011/134)
- The Uplands Transitional Payment Regulations (SI 2011/135)
- The Official Feed and Food Controls (England) (Amendment) Regulations (SI 2011/136)
- The A3 (M) Motorway and the A27 Trunk Road (A3 (M) Junctions 2–5, Southbound) (Temporary Restriction and Prohibition of Traffic) Order (SI 2011/137)
- The M25 Motorway, the M4 Motorway and the M40 Motorway (M25 Junctions 15 & 16) (Temporary Restriction and Prohibition of Traffic) Order (SI 2011/138)
- The A21 Trunk Road (Pillory Corner, Slip Road) (Temporary Prohibition of Traffic) Order (SI 2011/139)
- The A30 Trunk Road (Temple, Cornwall) (Temporary Restriction of Traffic) Order (SI 2011/140)
- The A36 Trunk Road (Dundas Layby, Near Monkton Combe, Bath) (Temporary Prohibition of Traffic) Order (SI 2011/141)
- The A35 Trunk Road (Berne Lane, Charmouth, to Tizard's Knap, Morcombelake, Dorset) (Temporary Restriction of Traffic) Order (SI 2011/142)
- The M1 Motorway (Junctions 15a – 16) (Temporary Restriction and Prohibition of Traffic) Order (SI 2011/143)
- The Crime and Security Act 2010 (Commencement 2) Order (SI 2011/144)
- The Export Control (Liberia) Order (SI 2011/145)
- The Export Control (Somalia) Order (SI 2011/146)
- The General Dental Council (Constitution of Committees) (Amendment) Rules Order of Council (SI 2011/147)
- The Assembly Learning Grants and Loans (Higher Education) (Wales) Regulations (SI 2011/148)
- The Education (School Day and School Year) (Wales) (Amendment) Regulations (SI 2011/149)
- The Animal Welfare (Code of Practice for the Welfare of Gamebirds Reared for Sporting Purposes) (Appointed Day) (England) Order (SI 2011/150)
- The A470 Trunk Road (South of Rhyd-y-car Roundabout, Merthyr Tydfil) (Temporary Prohibition of Vehicles) Order (SI 2011/151)
- The A52 Trunk Road (Brian Clough Way, Derby) (Link Road) (Temporary Prohibition of Traffic) Order (SI 2011/152)
- The A5 Trunk Road (A461 Muckley Corner Roundabout, Lichfield, Staffordshire) (Derestriction) Order (SI 2011/153)
- The Education (School Day and School Year) (England) (Amendment) Regulations (SI 2011/154)
- The Diocese of Chester (Educational Endowments) (Amendment) Order (SI 2011/155)
- The A19 Trunk Road and the A66 Trunk Road (Stockton Road Interchange) (Temporary Prohibition of Traffic) Order (SI 2011/156)
- The M6 Motorway (Northbound Exit Slip Road Leading to Rob Lane Motorway Depot) (Temporary Prohibition of Traffic) Order (SI 2011/157)
- The M62 Motorway (Junction 20 Roundabout & Eastbound Exit Slip Road) and the AA627(M) (Temporary Prohibition and Restriction of Traffic) Order (SI 2011/158)
- The Copyright (Certification of Licensing Scheme for Educational Recording of Broadcasts) (Educational Recording Agency Limited) (Amendment) Order (SI 2011/159)
- The A180 Trunk Road (Stallingborough Interchange) (Temporary Prohibition of Traffic) Order (SI 2011/160)
- The Bedford (Electoral Changes) Order (SI 2011/161)
- The Central Bedfordshire (Electoral Changes) Order (SI 2011/162)
- The Mansfield (Electoral Changes) Order (SI 2011/163)
- The Northampton (Electoral Changes) Order (SI 2011/164)
- The South Derbyshire (Electoral Changes) Order (SI 2011/165)
- The Sedgemoor (Electoral Changes) Order (SI 2011/166)
- The Stoke-on-Trent (Electoral Changes) Order (SI 2011/167)
- The West Somerset (Electoral Changes) Order (SI 2011/168)
- The Occupational Pension Schemes (Levy Ceiling – Earnings Percentage Increase) Order (SI 2011/169)
- The Inheritance Tax Avoidance Schemes (Prescribed Descriptions of Arrangements) Regulations (SI 2011/170)
- The Tax Avoidance Schemes (Information) (Amendment) Regulations (SI 2011/171)
- The M42 Motorway (Junction 3a) (Link Road) (Temporary Prohibition of Traffic) Order (SI 2011/172)
- The A500 Trunk Road (Wostanton to Stoke-on-Trent) (Temporary Restriction of Traffic) Order (SI 2011/173)
- The M6 Motorway (Junction 3a) (Temporary Restriction and Prohibition of Traffic) Order (SI 2011/174)
- The M50 Motorway (Junctions 4 to 2) (Temporary Prohibition of Traffic) Order (SI 2011/175)
- The M6 Motorway (Junctions 15 to 14) (Temporary Prohibition of Traffic) Order (SI 2011/176)
- The Inshore Fisheries and Conservation (Miscellaneous Amendments) Order (SI 2011/177)
- The A1(M) Motorway (Junction 36, Warmsworth) (Temporary Prohibition of Traffic) Order (SI 2011/178)
- The M6 Motorway (Junctions 39–42, Northbound and Southbound Carriageways) (Temporary Restriction of Traffic) Order (SI 2011/179)
- The M23 Motorway (Junctions 9 – 9A) (Temporary Prohibition of Traffic) Order (SI 2011/180)
- The A34 Trunk Road (Botley Interchange) (Closure of Lay-by) Order (SI 2011/181)
- The A34 Trunk Road (Botley Interchange) (50 Miles Per Hour Speed Limit) Order (SI 2011/182)
- The A421 Trunk Road (A4280 Renhold Interchange to A600/Harrowden Interchange, Bedford Southern Bypass, Bedfordshire) (Temporary Prohibition of Traffic) Order (SI 2011/183)
- The A47 Trunk Road (The Causeway Roundabout to B1167 New Cut/ Wisbech Road Roundabout, Thorney Bypass, Peterborough) (Temporary Restriction and Prohibition of Traffic) Order (SI 2011/184)
- The M1 Motorway (Junction 8, Hertfordshire) Northbound Entry Slip Road (Temporary Prohibition of Traffic) Order (SI 2011/185)
- The A1 Trunk Road (Seaton Burn to Tritlington) (Temporary Restriction and Prohibition of Traffic) Order (SI 2011/186)
- The A1 Trunk Road (Duns Road to the Scottish Border) (Temporary Restriction and Prohibition of Traffic) Order (SI 2011/187)
- The M4 Motorway (Junctions 13–14) (Temporary Restriction and Prohibition of Traffic) Order (SI 2011/188)
- The M3 Motorway (Junction 6) (temporary Restriction and Prohibition of Traffic) Order (SI 2011/189)
- The School Organisation (Miscellaneous Amendments) (Wales) Regulations (SI 2011/190)
- The Integrated Family Support Teams (Family Support Functions) (Wales) (Amendment) Regulations (SI 2011/191)
- The School Teachers’ Pay and Conditions (Amendment) Order (SI 2011/192)
- The M4 Motorway (Junction 24, Coldra to Junction 26, Malpas) (Temporary Traffic Restrictions & Prohibitions) Order (SI 2011/193)
- The A487 & A55 Trunk Roads (Junction 9 (Treborth), Bangor, Gwynedd) (Temporary 30 mph Speed Limit) Order (SI 2011/194)
- The A4042 Trunk Road (Pontypool Roundabout, Torfaen to Mamhilad Roundabout, Monmouthshire) (Temporary Traffic Restrictions and Prohibition) Order (SI 2011/195)
- The A3 Trunk Road (Hog's Back Interchange) (Temporary Prohibition of Traffic) Order (SI 2011/196)
- The Non-Domestic Rating (Unoccupied Property) (Wales) (Amendment) Regulations (SI 2011/197)
- The M3 Motorway (Junction 4 – Kitsmead Lane, Carriageways) (Temporary Restriction of Traffic) Order (SI 2011/198)
- The M25 Motorway and the A282 Trunk Road Road (Junctions 30 – 31, Clockwise) (Temporary 50 Miles Per Hour Speed Restriction) Order (SI 2011/199)
- The Apprenticeships, Skills, Children and Learning Act 2009 (Commencement 5) Order (SI 2011/200)

== 201–300 ==
- The A13 Trunk Road and the A1089 Trunk Road (Wennington Interchange – M25 Junction 30 and Marshfoot Interchange – Asda Roundabout) (Temporary Prohibition of Traffic) Order (SI 2011/201)
- The A55 Trunk Road (Eastbound Carriageway Lay-by, Rhuallt, Denbighshire) (Prohibition of Entry to Vehicles) Order (SI 2011/202)
- The M25 Motorway (Junctions 27–29) (Temporary restriction and Prohibition of Traffic) Order 2010 Variation Order (SI 2011/203)
- The M25 Motorway (Junctions 8–9) (Temporary Restriction and Prohibition of Traffic) Order (SI 2011/204)
- The Transport Act 2000 (Amendment of section 5(4)) Regulations (SI 2011/205)
- The M6 Toll (Slip Roads) (Temporary Prohibition of Traffic) Order (SI 2011/206)
- The Harwich Haven Authority (Pension Fund) Harbour Revision Order (SI 2011/207)
- The Armed Forces Redundancy Scheme 2006 and the Armed Forces Redundancy Etc. Schemes 2010 (Amendment) Order (SI 2011/208)
- The Criminal Procedure and Investigations Act 1996 (Defence Disclosure Time Limits) Regulations (SI 2011/209)
- The Health Professions Council (Registration and Fees) (Amendment) ( 2) Rules 2010 Order of Council (SI 2011/210)
- The NHS Redress (Wales) Measure 2008 (Commencement) Order (SI 2011/211)
- The Health and Social Care (Community Health and Standards) Act 2003 Commencement (Wales) ( 5) Order (SI 2011/212)
- The Food (Jelly Mini-Cups) (Emergency Control) (England) (Revocation) Regulations (SI 2011/213)
- The Inheritance Tax (Delivery of Accounts) (Excepted Estates) (Amendment) Regulations (SI 2011/214)
- The Air Navigation (Restriction of Flying) (Jet Formation Display Teams) Regulations (SI 2011/215)
- The M5 Motorway (Junction 19 Northbound Entry Slip Road) (Temporary Prohibition and Restriction of Traffic) Order (SI 2011/216)
- The A30 Trunk Road (Avers Junction, Redruth, and Treswithian Junction, Camborne) (Temporary Restriction of Traffic) Order (SI 2011/217)
- The Air Navigation (Restriction of Flying) (West Wales Airport) Regulations (SI 2011/218)
- The Apprenticeships (Specification of Apprenticeship Standards for England) Order (SI 2011/219)
- The Apprenticeship Sectors (Specification) Order (SI 2011/220)
- The A500 Trunk Road (Junction with Shelton New Road, Stoke-on-Trent) (Slip Road) (Temporary Prohibition of Traffic) Order (SI 2011/221)
- The A49 Trunk Road (Ross to Wye Hereford) (Temporary Restriction and Prohibition of Traffic) Order (SI 2011/222)
- The Air Navigation (Restriction of Flying) (Glastonbury Festival) Regulations (SI 2011/223)
- The Air Navigation (Restriction of Flying) (Abingdon Airshow) Regulations (SI 2011/224)
- The Social Security (Contributions) (Amendment) Regulations (SI 2011/225)
- The Bee Diseases and Pests Control (Wales) (Amendment) Order (SI 2011/226)
- The Competition Act 1998 (Public Transport Ticketing Schemes Block Exemption) (Amendment) Order (SI 2011/227)
- The Employment and Support Allowance (Limited Capability for Work and Limited Capability for Work-Related Activity) (Amendment) Regulations (SI 2011/228)
- The Crime (International Co-operation) Act 2003 (Designation of Participating Countries) (England, Wales and Northern Ireland) ( 2) Order (SI 2011/229)
- The Police Federation (Amendment) Regulations (SI 2011/230)
- The Plastic Materials and Articles in Contact with Food (England) (Amendment) Regulations (SI 2011/231)
- The Gas (Exemptions) Order (SI 2011/232)
- The Plastic Materials and Articles in Contact with Food (Wales) (Amendment) Regulations (SI 2011/233)
- The CRC Energy Efficiency Scheme (Amendment) Order (SI 2011/234)
- The Naval, Military and Air Forces Etc. (Disablement and Death) Service Pensions (Amendment) Order (SI 2011/235)
- The Films Co-Production Agreements (Amendment) Order (SI 2011/236)
- The Air Navigation (Overseas Territories) (Amendment) Order (SI 2011/237)
- The North West London Hospitals National Health Service Trust (Transfer of Trust Property) Order (SI 2011/238)
- The Investment Bank (Amendment of Definition) Order (SI 2011/239)
- The Air Navigation (Restriction of Flying) (Cheltenham Festival) Regulations (SI 2011/240)
- The Air Navigation (Restriction of Flying) (Lowestoft) Regulations (SI 2011/241)
- The A487 Trunk Road (Ty Cerrig, Garndolbenmaen, Gwynedd) (Temporary Traffic Restrictions & Prohibition) Order (SI 2011/242)
- The Promotion of the Use of Energy from Renewable Sources Regulations (SI 2011/243)
- The Authorised Investment Funds (Tax) (Amendment) Regulations (SI 2011/244)
- The Investment Bank Special Administration Regulations (SI 2011/245)
- The M4 Motorway (Junction 45 (Ynysforgan) and Junction 48 (Hendy)) (Temporary Prohibition of Vehicles & Trafficking of Hard Shoulder) Order (SI 2011/246)
- The Cobham Motorway Service Area Trunk Road Order (SI 2011/247)
- The M25 Motorway (Cobham Motorway Service Area Temporary Special Road) Scheme (SI 2011/248)
- The Cobham Motorway Service Area Trunk Road (Connecting Roads) Order (SI 2011/249)
- The M50 Motorway (Junction 2, Bury Court) (Temporary Restriction and Prohibition of Traffic) Order (SI 2011/250)
- The M5 Motorway (Junctions 7 ? 5, Worcestershire) (Temporary Prohibition of Traffic) Order (SI 2011/251)
- The A38 Trunk Road (A38/A5148 Interchange, Swinfen, Staffordshire) (Slip Road) (Temporary Prohibition of Traffic) Order (SI 2011/252)
- The Buckinghamshire Primary Care Trust (Transfer of Trust Property) Order (SI 2011/253)
- The Value Added Tax (Amendment) Regulations (SI 2011/254)
- The Non-Domestic Rating and Business Rate Supplements (England) (Amendment) Regulations (SI 2011/255)
- The M5 Motorway (Junction 17 Northbound Exit Slip Road) (Temporary Prohibition of Traffic) Order (SI 2011/256)
- The M4 Motorway (Junction 41, Pentyla to Junction 38, Margam, Neath Port Talbot) (Temporary Prohibition of Vehicles) Order (SI 2011/257)
- The Food Additives (England) (Amendment) Regulations (SI 2011/258)
- The A34 Trunk Road (North of Donnington, Southbound Exit Slip Road) (Temporary Prohibition of Traffic) Order (SI 2011/259)
- The A47 Trunk Road (Dereham, Norfolk) (Prohibition of Entry) Order (SI 2011/260)
- The A5 Trunk Road (Gailey Wharf, Staffordshire) (Temporary 30 Miles Per Hour Speed Limit) Order (SI 2011/261)
- The A500 Trunk Road (Hanford, Staffordshire) (Slip Road) (Temporary Prohibition of Traffic) Order (SI 2011/262)
- The M1 Motorway (Junctions 25 – 24) (Temporary Restriction and Prohibition of Traffic) Order (SI 2011/263)
- The A46 Trunk Road (Wanlip, Leicestershire) (Temporary Prohibition of Traffic) Order (SI 2011/264)
- The A5 Trunk Road (Near Hinckley, Leicestershire) (Temporary Prohibition of Traffic) Order (SI 2011/265)
- The A45 Trunk Road (Stanwick to Raunds) (Temporary Prohibition of Traffic) Order (SI 2011/266)
- The M40 Motorway (Junction 10, Oxfordshire) Northbound Entry Slip Road (Temporary Restriction and Prohibition of Traffic) Order (SI 2011/267)
- The A1 Trunk Road (Near Stamford) (Slip Roads) (Temporary Prohibition of Traffic) Order (SI 2011/268)
- The National Health Service (Quality Accounts) Amendment Regulations (SI 2011/269)
- The Local Curriculum in Higher Education Institutions (Wales) Regulations (SI 2011/270)
- The M56 Motorway (Junction 6 Eastbound Entry Slip Road) (Temporary Prohibition of Traffic) Order (SI 2011/271)
- The M1 Motorway (Junction 34) and the A631 Trunk Road (Tinsley Viaduct) (Temporary Prohibition of Traffic) Order (SI 2011/272)
- The A1(M) Motorway and M18 Motorway (Wadworth Interchange) (Temporary Restriction and Prohibition of Traffic) Order (SI 2011/273)
- The M62 Motorway (Junction 12 Eastbound and Westbound Carriageways) and the M602 Motorway (Temporary Prohibition and Restriction of Traffic) Order (SI 2011/274)
- The M180 Motorway (Junction 1 to Junction 2) (Temporary Prohibition of Traffic) Order (SI 2011/275)
- The M62 Motorway (Junction 36 to Junction 37) (Temporary Prohibition of Traffic) Order (SI 2011/276)
- The A5 Trunk Road (Churncote Roundabout to Bayleys Roundabout, Shrewsbury) (Temporary Prohibition of Traffic) Order (SI 2011/277)
- The M54 Motorway (Junctions 2 to 4) (Temporary Prohibition of Traffic) Order (SI 2011/278)
- The A47 Trunk Road (A141 Guyhirn Roundabout to B198 Redmoor Lane Roundabout, Wisbech, Cambridgeshire) (Temporary Prohibition of Traffic) Order (SI 2011/279)
- The M62 Motorway (Junction 27) and the M621 Motorway (Gildersome) (Temporary Prohibition of Traffic) Order (SI 2011/280)
- The M5 and M6 Motorways (M6 Junction 8) (Ray Hall Interchange) (Temporary Restriction and Prohibition of Traffic) Order (SI 2011/281)
- The A500 Trunk Road (Sideway, Stoke-on-Trent) (Temporary Prohibition of Traffic) Order (SI 2011/282)
- The A3 Trunk Road (Stoke Road – Compton) (Temporary Restriction of Traffic) Order (SI 2011/283)
- The A34 Trunk Road (Tot Hill Interchange, Northbound Entry Slip Road) (Temporary Prohibition of Traffic) Order (SI 2011/284)
- The M3 Motorway (Junction 9, Northbound Exit Slip Road) (Temporary Prohibition of Traffic) Order (SI 2011/286)
- The M27 Motorway (Junctions 1 – 12, Carriageways) (Temporary Restriction of Traffic) Order (SI 2011/287)
- The A14 Trunk Road (Junction 52, Claydon Interchange, Suffolk) (Prohibition of Entry) Order (SI 2011/288)
- The A47 Trunk Road (Hockering, Norfolk) (Temporary Restriction and Prohibition of Traffic) Order (SI 2011/289)
- The A303 Trunk Road (Southfields Roundabout, Ilminster) (Temporary Prohibition and Restriction of Traffic) Order (SI 2011/290)
- The A14 Trunk Road (Junction 28 Swavesey/Boxworth, Cambridgeshire) Westbound Entry and Exit Slip Roads (Temporary Prohibition of Traffic) Order (SI 2011/291)
- The A1 Trunk Road (Warenford and North Charlton) (Temporary Restriction and Prohibition of Traffic) Order (SI 2011/292)
- The A5 Trunk Road (Potterspury, Northamptonshire) (Temporary Prohibition of Traffic) Order (SI 2011/293)
- The A453 Trunk Road (M1 Junction 24 to Crusader Roundabout) (Temporary Prohibition of Traffic) Order (SI 2011/294)
- The M1 Motorway (Junctions 25 – 24a) (Temporary Restriction and Prohibition of Traffic) Order (SI 2011/295)
- The M62 Motorway (Junctions 6–9, Eastbound and Westbound Carriageways, Link and Slip Roads) (Temporary Prohibition and Restriction of Traffic) Order (SI 2011/296)
- The Higher Education Act 2004 (Commencement 3) (Wales) Order (SI 2011/297)
- The M6 Motorway (Junction 33 Northbound and Southbound Exit Slip Roads) (Temporary Prohibition of Traffic) Order (SI 2011/298)
- The A590 Trunk Road (High Newton to Staveley) (Temporary Prohibition and Restriction of Traffic) Order (SI 2011/299)
- The Police Act 1996 (Equipment) Regulations (SI 2011/300)

== 301–400 ==
- The Registered Pension Schemes (Provision of Information) (Amendment) Regulations (SI 2011/301)
- The Registered Pension Schemes (Accounting and Assessment) (Amendment) Regulations (SI 2011/302)
- The A2 Trunk Road (Thanington – Brenley Corner, Londonbound) (Temporary Restriction and Prohibition of Traffic) Order (SI 2011/303)
- The A3(M) Motorway and the A27 Trunk Road (Junction 5, Northbound) (Temporary Restriction of Traffic) Order (SI 2011/304)
- The A27 Trunk Road (Beddingham Roundabout – Firle) (Temporary Restriction and Prohibition of Traffic) Order (SI 2011/305)
- The A1 Trunk Road (Birtley Interchange) (Temporary Prohibition of Traffic) Order (SI 2011/306)
- The A57 Trunk Road (Mottram Roundabout to Market Street) (Temporary Restriction and Prohibition of Traffic) Order (SI 2011/307)
- The A63 Trunk Road (Welton) (Temporary Prohibition of Traffic) Order (SI 2011/308)
- The Registrar of Companies (Fees) (Companies, Overseas Companies and Limited Liability Partnerships) (Amendment) Regulations (SI 2011/309)
- The M1 Motorway (Junction 30 to Junction 31 and Junction 37) (Temporary Restriction and Prohibition of Traffic) Order (SI 2011/310)
- The A1 Trunk Road (Dishforth to Scotch Corner) (Temporary Restriction and Prohibition of Traffic) Order (SI 2011/311)
- The A1 Trunk Road (Shotton Lane Interchange to Gosforth Park Interchange) (Temporary Restriction and Prohibition of Traffic) Order (SI 2011/312)
- The Local Authorities (Alteration of Requisite Calculations) (England) Regulations (SI 2011/313)
- The M5 Motorway (Junctions 29 and 30) (Temporary Prohibition of Traffic) Order (SI 2011/314)
- The M5 Motorway (Junction 31) (Temporary Prohibition of Traffic) Order (SI 2011/315)
- The Wireless Telegraphy (Mobile Communication Services on Board Ships) (Exemption) Regulations (SI 2011/316)
- The M5 Motorway (Junction 25 Slip Roads) (Temporary Prohibition of Traffic) Order (SI 2011/317)
- The M5 Motorway (Junction 21) (Temporary Prohibition and Restriction of Traffic) Order (SI 2011/318)
- The Registrar of Companies (Fees) (Limited Partnerships) (Amendment) Regulations (SI 2011/319)
- The A64 Trunk Road (Steelmoor Lane to Welburn Crossroads) (Temporary Restriction and Prohibition of Traffic) Order (SI 2011/320)
- The M32 Motorway (Junctions 1–3) (Temporary Prohibition of Traffic) Order (SI 2011/321)
- The A30 Trunk Road (Newtown Roundabout to Chy-an-Mor Roundabout, Penzance) (Temporary Prohibition and Restriction of Traffic) Order (SI 2011/322)
- The M18 Motorway and the M62 Motorway (Langham Interchange) (Temporary Prohibition of Traffic) Order (SI 2011/323)
- The Registrar of Companies (Fees) (European Economic Interest Grouping) (Amendment) Regulations (SI 2011/324)
- The A66 Trunk Road (Scotch Corner to Forcett Lane) (Temporary Restriction and Prohibition of Traffic) Order (SI 2011/325)
- The A1(M) Motorway (Junction 58 to Junction 59) (Temporary Restriction and Prohibition of Traffic) Order (SI 2011/326)
- The M55 Motorway (Junctions 4–3, Eastbound Carriageway and Junction 4 Eastbound Entry Slip Road) (Temporary Prohibition and Restriction of Traffic) Order (SI 2011/327)
- The A66 Trunk Road (Bassenthwaite Lake) (Temporary Prohibition and Restriction of Traffic) Order (SI 2011/328)
- The M61 Motorway (Junction 3 Southbound Link Road to the A666 and the Southbound Entry Slip Road from the A666) (Temporary Prohibition of Traffic) Order (SI 2011/329)
- The Welfare Reform Act 2007 (Commencement 13) Order (SI 2011/330)
- The M60 Motorway (Junction 10 Anticlockwise and Clockwise Exit and Entry Slip Roads and the Dedicated Left Turn Lane from the B5214) (Temporary Prohibition of Traffic) Order (SI 2011/331)
- The M6 Motorway (Junctions 27–24, Southbound Carriageway and Northbound and Southbound Slip Roads) (Temporary Prohibition and Restriction of Traffic) Order (SI 2011/332)
- The A4042 Trunk Road (Edlogan Way Roundabout, Cwmbran, Torfaen) (Temporary Traffic Prohibition) Order (SI 2011/333)
- The A483 Trunk Road (Derwydd, Carmarthenshire) (Temporary Traffic Restrictions & Prohibition) Order (SI 2011/334)
- The A1(M) Motorway (Junction 7, Hertfordshire) (Temporary Restriction and Prohibition of Traffic) Order (SI 2011/335)
- The A259 Trunk Road (Little Common Road) (Temporary 10 Miles Per Hour Speed Restriction) Order (SI 2011/336)
- The M25 and M11 Motorways (M25 Junctions 25 – 27 and M11 Junctions 4 – 6) (Temporary Restriction and Prohibition of Traffic) Order (SI 2011/337)
- The A404 Trunk Road (A4155 Junction – Bisham Roundabout, Southbound Carriageway) (Temporary Restriction and Prohibition of Traffic) Order (SI 2011/338)
- The A494 Trunk Road (Glan-yr-Afon to Braich Du, Gwynedd) (Temporary Traffic Restrictions and Prohibition) Order (SI 2011/339)
- The M4 Motorway (Junctions 14 – 15) (Temporary Prohibition of Traffic) Order (SI 2011/340)
- The A27 Trunk Road (Poling Corner – Hammerpot) (Temporary 40 Miles Per Hour Speed Restriction) Order (SI 2011/341)
- The A21 Trunk Road (John's Cross – Baldslow, Carriageways) (Temporary Prohibition of Traffic) Order (SI 2011/342)
- The M4 Motorway (Junctions 10 – 11) (Temporary Prohibition of Traffic) Order (SI 2011/343)
- The M4 Motorway (Junctions 11 – 12) (Temporary Prohibition of Traffic) Order (SI 2011/344)
- The A31 Trunk Road (Cadnam – Verwood Interchange) (Temporary Restriction and Prohibition of Traffic) Order (SI 2011/345)
- The M49 Motorway and M4 Motorway (Junction 22) (Temporary Prohibition and Restriction of Traffic) Order (SI 2011/346)
- The M5 and M42 Motorways (M5 Junctions 4a to 4) (Temporary Prohibition of Traffic) Order (SI 2011/347)
- The M1 Motorway (South of Junction 29) (Temporary Restriction and Prohibition of Traffic) Order (SI 2011/348)
- The A14 Trunk Road (East of Junction 41 Risby Interchange to West of Junction 42 Westley Interchange, Suffolk) (Prohibition of Entry) Order (SI 2011/349)
- The A1 Trunk Road (Stamford to Blyth) (Temporary Prohibition of Traffic in Laybys) Order (SI 2011/350)
- The M42 Motorway (Junction 3) (Southbound Entry Slip Road) (Temporary Prohibition of Traffic) Order (SI 2011/351)
- The M4 Motorway & A4232 Trunk Road (Junction 33 (Cardiff West), Cardiff) (Temporary Prohibition of Vehicles and 50 MPH Speed Limit) Order (SI 2011/352)
- The A14 Trunk Road (Junctions with the A5199 and A508, Northamptonshire) (Slip Roads) (Temporary Prohibition of Traffic) Order (SI 2011/353)
- The A14 Trunk Road (Cranford St John, Northamptonshire) (Slip Road) (Temporary Prohibition of Traffic) Order (SI 2011/354)
- The M42 Motorway (Junction 2) (Southbound Entry Slip Road) (Temporary Prohibition of Traffic) Order (SI 2011/355)
- The A46 Trunk Road (Wanlip to Anstey, Leicestershire) (Temporary Prohibition of Traffic) Order (SI 2011/356)
- The M25 Motorway (Junction 12, Anti-Clockwise Carriageway) (Temporary Prohibition of Traffic) Order (SI 2011/357)
- The A27 Trunk Road (Holmbush Interchange – Hangleton) (Temporary Prohibition of Traffic) Order (SI 2011/358)
- The M25 Motorway (Junctions 6 – 5, Clacket Lane) (Temporary Restriction of Traffic) Order (SI 2011/359)
- The A13 Trunk Road (North Stifford and M25 Junction 30) (Temporary Prohibition of Traffic) Order (SI 2011/360)
- The A282 Trunk Road (Junction 1B, Anti-Clockwise Entry Slip Road) (Temporary Prohibition of Traffic) Order (SI 2011/361)
- The A27 Trunk Road (Folkington – Wilmington) (Temporary Prohibition of Traffic) Order (SI 2011/362)
- The M4 Motorway (Junction 11) (Temporary Prohibition of Traffic) Order (SI 2011/363)
- The A417 and A419 Trunk Roads (Gloucester to Swindon Layby Closures) (Temporary Prohibition of Traffic) Order (SI 2011/364)
- The M5 Motorway (Junctions 13–14) (Temporary Restriction of Traffic) Order (SI 2011/365)
- The A303 Trunk Road (Wylye to Chicklade, Wiltshire) (Temporary Prohibition of Traffic) Order (SI 2011/366)
- The A36 Trunk Road (Steeple Langford, Wiltshire) (Temporary Restriction of Traffic) Order (SI 2011/367)
- The M5 Motorway (Junctions 15–16 Southbound) (Temporary Prohibition of Traffic) Order (SI 2011/368)
- The A36 Trunk Road (A27 Brickworth Road to Romsey Roundabout) (Temporary Prohibition of Traffic) Order (SI 2011/369)
- The A19 Trunk Road (Silverlink Interchange to Howdon Interchange) (Temporary Prohibition of Traffic) Order (SI 2011/370)
- The School Finance (England) Regulations (SI 2011/371)
- The A1 Trunk Road (Eighton Lodge Interchange to Coalhouse Interchange) (Temporary Prohibition of Traffic) Order (SI 2011/372)
- The A696 Trunk Road (Kenton Bar Interchange to Black Callerton Lane Interchange) (Temporary Restriction and Prohibition of Traffic) Order (SI 2011/373)
- The A66 Trunk Road (Yarm Road Interchange to Teesside Park Interchange) (Temporary Restriction and Prohibition of Traffic) Order (SI 2011/374)
- The A1 Trunk Road (Near Grantham, Lincolnshire) (Slip Roads) (Temporary Prohibition of Traffic) Order (SI 2011/375)
- The A46 Trunk Road (Bishopton to Marraway, Warwickshire) (Temporary Restriction and Prohibition of Traffic) Order (SI 2011/376)
- The A38 Trunk Road (Barton-under-Needwood to Alrewas, Staffordshire) (Temporary Prohibition of Traffic) Order (SI 2011/377)
- The M5 Motorway (Junction 5, Wychbold) (Southbound Entry Slip Road) (Temporary Prohibition of Traffic) Order (SI 2011/378)
- The M5 Motorway (Junctions 2 – 4a) (Temporary Restriction and Prohibition of Traffic) Order (SI 2011/379)
- The A63 Trunk Road (Mytongate Gyratory to Daltry Street Interchange and Garrison Road Roundabout) (Temporary Prohibition of Traffic) Order (SI 2011/380)
- The M1 Motorway and the M18 Motorway (Thurcroft Interchange) (Temporary Prohibition of Traffic) Order (SI 2011/381)
- The M56 Motorway (Junctions 7–9 Westbound Carriageway and Junction 8 Westbound Entry Slip Road) (Temporary Prohibition and Restriction of Traffic) Order (SI 2011/382)
- The A595 Trunk Road (Calderbridge Resurfacing) (Temporary Prohibition and Restriction of Traffic) Order (SI 2011/383)
- The A36 Trunk Road (Wilton Roundabout, Wilton, near Salisbury) (40 mph Speed Limit) Order (SI 2011/384)
- The A36 Trunk Road (Wilton to Salisbury) (50 mph Speed Limit) Order 2006 (Variation) Order (SI 2011/385)
- The A55 Trunk Road (Rhuallt Hill, St Asaph, Denbighshire) (Temporary 40 MPH Speed Limit) Order (SI 2011/386)
- The A585 Trunk Road (Norcross Junction Improvement) (Temporary Restriction and Prohibition of Traffic) Order (SI 2011/387)
- The A55 Trunk Road (Penmaenbach Tunnels, Conwy) (Temporary Traffic Restrictions & Prohibitions) Order (SI 2011/388)
- The A66 Trunk Road (West Layton to Winston Crossroads) (Temporary Restriction and Prohibition of Traffic) Order (SI 2011/389)
- The Trunk Road (A38) (Pearces Hill to Tamar Bridge, Devon) (24-Hour Main Carriageway Clearway) Order 1987 (Variation) Order (SI 2011/390)
- The A5 Trunk Road (Flamstead, Hertfordshire) (50 Miles Per Hour Speed Limit) Order (SI 2011/391)
- The A696 Trunk Road (Kenton Bank Foot Interchange to Prestwick Road End Roundabout) (Temporary Restriction and Prohibition of Traffic) Order (SI 2011/392)
- The M42 Motorway (Junction 3a to Junction 4) (Temporary Prohibition of Traffic) Order (SI 2011/393)
- The M6 Motorway (Junction 6, Gravelly Hill) (Slip Road) (Temporary Prohibition of Traffic) Order (SI 2011/394)
- The M54 Motorway (Junction 2) (Westbound Entry Slip Road) (Temporary Prohibition of Traffic) Order (SI 2011/395)
- The A21 Trunk Road (Blue Boys Roundabout – Forstal Farm Roundabout) (Temporary Prohibition of Traffic) Order (SI 2011/396)
- The M25 and the M1 Motorways (M25 Junctions 23 – 25/M1 Junction 4) (Temporary Restriction of Traffic) Order (SI 2011/397)
- The A23 Trunk Road (Airport Way, Gatwick) (Temporary Restriction and Prohibition of Traffic) Order (SI 2011/398)
- The A20 Trunk Road (Courtwood Interchange – M20 Junction 13, Londonbound) (Temporary Prohibition of Traffic) Order (SI 2011/399)
- The Natural Mineral Water, Spring Water and Bottled Drinking Water (Wales) (Amendment) Regulations (SI 2011/400)

== 401–500 ==
- The M11 Motorway (Junction 13, Cambridgeshire) Southbound Entry Slip Road (Temporary Prohibition of Traffic) Order (SI 2011/401)
- The Food Labelling (Declaration of Allergens) (England) Regulations (SI 2011/402)
- The A14 Trunk Road (East of Whitehouse Interchange Junction 53, Ipswich to Cedars Interchange Junction 50, Stowmarket, Suffolk) (Temporary Restriction and Prohibition of Traffic) Order (SI 2011/403)
- The New Forest (Electoral Changes) Order (SI 2011/404)
- The Marine and Coastal Access Act 2009 (Amendment) Regulations (SI 2011/405)
- The Rotherham (Electoral Changes) Order (SI 2011/406)
- The M18 Motorway (Junction 3, St Catherines) (Temporary Prohibition of Traffic) Order (SI 2011/407)
- The M56 Motorway (Junctions 14-12 Eastbound Carriageway and Eastbound and Westbound Slip Roads) (Temporary Prohibition and Restriction of Traffic) Order (SI 2011/408)
- The Marine Licensing (Exempted Activities) Order (SI 2011/409)
- The Serious Organised Crime and Police Act 2005 (Commencement No.14) Order (SI 2011/410)
- The A1 Trunk Road (Stretton, Rutland) (Temporary Prohibition of Traffic) Order (SI 2011/411)
- The Police and Criminal Evidence Act 1984 (Codes of Practice) (Revision of Codes A, B and D) Order (SI 2011/412)
- The A1 Trunk Road (Belford to Fenwick and Cheswick to East Ord) (Temporary Restriction and Prohibition of Traffic) Order (SI 2011/413)
- The Crime and Security Act 2010 (Commencement No.3) Order (SI 2011/414)
- The Healthy Start Scheme (Description of Healthy Start Food) (Wales) (Amendment) Regulations (SI 2011/415)
- The A55 Trunk Road (Junction 22, Old Colwyn to Junction 25, Bodelwyddan, Conwy) (Temporary Traffic Prohibitions and Restrictions) Order (SI 2011/416)
- The A45 Trunk Road (Great Billing Way Interchange, Northampton) (Temporary Restriction and Prohibition of Traffic) Order (SI 2011/417)
- The A483 Trunk Road (Ruabon Interchange (Junction 1), Wrexham) (Temporary Prohibition of Vehicles) Order (SI 2011/418)
- The A46 Trunk Road (Groby to Anstey, Leicestershire) (Temporary Prohibition of Traffic in Laybys) Order (SI 2011/419)
- The A42 Trunk Road (Packington to Appleby Magna, Leicestershire) (Temporary Prohibition of Traffic) Order (SI 2011/420)
- The A46 Trunk Road (Winthorpe to Thorpe on the Hill) (Temporary Prohibition of Traffic in Laybys) Order (SI 2011/421)
- The A52 Trunk Road (Bingham to Grantham) (Temporary Restriction and Prohibition of Traffic Order (SI 2011/422)
- The Petroleum Act 1998 (Specified Pipelines) Order (SI 2011/423)
- The Marine Licensing (Register of Licensing Information) Regulations (SI 2011/424)
- The Air Traffic Services (Exemption) Order (SI 2011/425)
- The Healthy Start Scheme and Welfare Food (Amendment) Regulations (SI 2011/426)
- The Road Vehicles (Construction and Use) (Amendment) Regulations (SI 2011/427)
- The Salford City Council (Greengate Bridge) Scheme 2010 Confirmation Instrument (SI 2011/428)
- The Cambridgeshire County Council (St. Neots Southern Foot and Cycle Bridge) Scheme 2010 Confirmation Instrument (SI 2011/429)
- The A465 Trunk Road (Llandarcy to Cwmgwrach, Neath Port Talbot) (Temporary Traffic Restrictions and Prohibitions) Order (SI 2011/430)
- The Control of Donations and Regulation of Loans etc. (Extension of the Prescribed Period) (Northern Ireland) Order (SI 2011/431)
- The Student Fees (Amounts) (England) (Amendment) Regulations (SI 2011/432)
- The Civil Enforcement of Parking Contraventions (County of Powys) Designation Order (SI 2011/433)
- The Valuation Tribunal for England, Non-Domestic Rating and Council Tax (England) (Amendment) Regulations (SI 2011/434)
- The Town and Country Planning (Blight Provisions) (Wales) Order (SI 2011/435)
- The Scotter Drainage Authority and Scotter Internal Drainage District (Abolition) Order (SI 2011/436)
- The Reconstitution of the Witham Fourth District Drainage Board Order (SI 2011/437)
- The Wireless Telegraphy (Crown Recognised Spectrum Access) (Amendment) Regulations (SI 2011/438)
- The Wireless Telegraphy (Register) (Amendment) Regulations (SI 2011/439)
- The Wireless Telegraphy (Recognised Spectrum Access and Licence) (Spectrum Trading) (Amendment) Regulations (SI 2011/440)
- The Wireless Telegraphy (Limitation of Number of Grants of Crown Recognised Spectrum Access) Order (SI 2011/441)
- The A487 Trunk Road (Glandyfi Improvement, Ceredigion) (Temporary Traffic Prohibition and Restrictions) Order (SI 2011/442)
- The A55 Trunk Road (Westbound Carriageway at Junction 32b, Halkyn, Flintshire) (Temporary Traffic Restriction & Prohibitions) Order 2 (SI 2011/443)
- The A55 Trunk Road (Westbound Carriageway at Junction 19 (Glan Conwy Interchange), Conwy) (Temporary 40 mph Speed Limit) Order (SI 2011/444)
- The Immigration and Nationality (Fees) Order (SI 2011/445)
- The Local Authorities (Alteration of Requisite Calculations) (Wales) Regulations (SI 2011/446)
- The Misuse of Drugs (Designation) (Amendment) (England, Wales and Scotland) Order (SI 2011/447)
- The Misuse of Drugs (Amendment) (England, Wales and Scotland) Regulations (SI 2011/448)
- The Air Navigation (Restriction of Flying) (Kemble) Regulations (SI 2011/449)
- The Air Navigation (Restriction of Flying) (Silverstone and Turweston) Regulations (SI 2011/450)
- The Natural Mineral Water, Spring Water and Bottled Drinking Water (England) (Amendment) Regulations (SI 2011/451)
- The Poultrymeat (England) Regulations (SI 2011/452)
- The Diocese of York (Educational Endowments) (Escrick Church of England Primary School) Order (SI 2011/453)
- The Bovine Semen (England) (Amendment) Regulations (SI 2011/454)
- The Stamp Duty Land Tax (Administration) (Amendment) Regulations (SI 2011/455)
- The Reporting of Prices of Milk Products (England) (Amendment) Regulations (SI 2011/456)
- The A43 Trunk Road (Silverstone, Northamptonshire) (Temporary Prohibition of Traffic) Order (SI 2011/457)
- The A52 Trunk Road (Bingham to Grantham) (Temporary Restriction and Prohibition of Traffic) Order (SI 2011/458)
- The A1 Trunk Road (Fenwick Junction to Detchant Lodge) (Temporary Restriction and Prohibition of Traffic) Order (SI 2011/459)
- The M4 Motorway (Slip Roads Between Junction 24 (Coldra) and Junction 28 (Tredegar Park)) (Temporary Prohibition of Vehicles) Order (SI 2011/460)
- The A48 Trunk Road (Chepstow, Monmouthshire) (50 mph Speed Limit) Order (SI 2011/461)
- The Horserace Betting and Olympic Lottery Act 2004 (Commencement No.4) Order (SI 2011/462)
- The Seed Marketing Regulations (SI 2011/463)
- The Seeds (National Lists of Varieties) (Amendment) Regulations (SI 2011/464)
- The Food Labelling (Declaration of Allergens) (Wales) Regulations (SI 2011/465)
- The A1 Trunk Road (Westerhope Interchange to Fawdon Interchange) and the A696 Trunk Road (Kenton Bar Interchange to Black Callerton Lane Interchange) (Temporary Restriction and Prohibition of Traffic) Order (SI 2011/466)
- The M180 Motorway (Junction 1 to Junction 5) (Temporary Prohibition of Traffic) Order (SI 2011/467)
- The A249 Trunk Road (Kingsferry Junction – Cowstead Roundabout) (Temporary Prohibition of Traffic) Order (SI 2011/468)
- The A30 Trunk Road (Crooked Billet Roundabout) (Temporary Prohibition of Traffic) Order (SI 2011/469)
- The M27 Motorway (Junction 4, Eastbound) (Temporary Prohibition of Traffic) Order (SI 2011/470)
- The M3 Motorway (Junction 9, Sougthbound) (Temporary Prohibition of Traffic) Order (SI 2011/471)
- The A36 Trunk Road (Whaddon, near Slaisbury) (Temporary Prohibition and Restriction of Traffic) Order (SI 2011/472)
- The Northern Ireland Assembly Elections (Returning Officer's Charges) Order (SI 2011/473)
- The A30 Trunk Road (Bodmin) (Temporary Restriction of Traffic) Order (SI 2011/474)
- The Social Security Revaluation of Earnings Factors Order (SI 2011/475)
- The Waste (Wales) Measure 2010 (Commencement) Order (SI 2011/476)
- The Social Security Pensions (Low Earnings Threshold) Order (SI 2011/477)
- The A52 Trunk Road (Bramcote Roundabout to QMC Roundabout, Nottingham) (Temporary Restriction and Prohibition of Traffic) Order (SI 2011/478)
- The M1 Motorway (Junction 45 to Junction 46) (Temporary Restriction and Prohibition of Traffic) Order (SI 2011/479)
- The A46 Trunk Road (M4 Junction 18 to Cold Ashton Roundabout (Temporary Prohibition of Traffic) Order (SI 2011/480)
- The M6 Motorway (Junction 16–20 Northbound and Southbound Carriageways and Slip Roads) (Temporary Prohibition and Restriction of Traffic) Order (SI 2011/481)
- The M53 Motorway (Junction 10 Southbound Carriageway and Entry Slip Road) (Temporary Prohibition of Traffic) Order (SI 2011/482)
- The M6 Motorway (Junction 39 Northbound and Junction 41 Southbound Carriageways and Slip Roads) (Temporary Prohibition and Restriction of Traffic) Order (SI 2011/483)
- The A66 Trunk Road (Lamplugh Resurfacing) (Temporary Prohibition and Restriction of Traffic) Order (SI 2011/484)
- The A66 Trunk Road (Chapel Brow and Fritz Roundabouts) (Temporary Prohibition of Traffic) Order (SI 2011/485)
- The A421 Trunk Road (M1 Junction 13 to Bedford) 24 Hour Clearway) Order (SI 2011/486)
- The A631 Trunk Road (Tinsley Viaduct) (Temporary Prohibition of Traffic) Order (SI 2011/487)
- The A55103 Trunk Road (Southbound Carriageway) and the M60 (Junction 5 Anticlockwise Entry Slip Road) (Temporary Prohibition of Traffic) Order (SI 2011/488)
- The M61 Motorway (Junction 6, Northbound Exit Slip Road) (Temporary Prohibition of Traffic) Order (SI 2011/489)
- The M65 Motorway (Junctions 5-4 Westbound Carriageway and Junction 5 Westbound Entry Slip Road) (Temporary Prohibition of Traffic) Order (SI 2011/490)
- The M56 Motorway (Junction 4 Westbound Exit Slip Road) (Temporary Prohibition of Traffic) Order (SI 2011/491)
- The A56 Trunk Road (Northbound Carriageway and Slip Roads) and the M66 Motorway (Northbound) (Temporary Prohibition of Traffic) Order (SI 2011/492)
- The Office of the Renewable Fuels Agency (Dissolution and Transfer of Functions) Order (SI 2011/493)
- The M62 Motorway (Junction 21 Eastbound Carriageway and Entry Slip Road) (Temporary Prohibition and Restriction of Traffic) Order (SI 2011/494)
- The A1 Trunk Road (Highmoor Junction to Lane Head Junction) (Temporary Restriction and Prohibition of Traffic) Order (SI 2011/495)
- The A303 Trunk Road (A30 to Southfields Roundabout, Ilminster) (Temporary Prohibition of Traffic) Order (SI 2011/496)
- The M271 Motorway (M27 Junction 3 – Romsey Road) (Temporary Prohibition of Traffic) Order (SI 2011/497)
- The A259 Trunk Road (Winchelsea Road, Guestling Green) (Temporary 50 Miles Per Hour Speed Restriction) Order (SI 2011/498)
- The A2 Trunk Road (Brenley Corner – Coldred) (Temporary Speed Restrictions) Order (SI 2011/499)
- The M25 Motorway (Junctions 9 – 10) (Temporary Restriction and Prohibition of Traffic) Order (SI 2011/500)

== 501–600 ==
- The M4 Motorway (Junction 7, Westbound Exit Slip Road) (Temporary Prohibition of Traffic) Order (SI 2011/501)
- The A259 Trunk Road (Main Road, Icklesham) (Temporary 40 Miles Per Hour Speed Restriction) Order (SI 2011/502)
- The National Health Service (Functions of Strategic Health Authorities and Primary Care Trusts and Administration Arrangements) (England) (Amendment) Regulations (SI 2011/503)
- The A2 Trunk Road (Dover Road) (Temporary 50 Miles Per Hour Speed Restriction) Order (SI 2011/504)
- The A259 Trunk Road (Guestling Thorn) (Temporary 40 Miles Per Hour Speed Restriction) Order (SI 2011/505)
- The A21 Trunk Road (Quarry Hill Interchange, Coastbound) (Temporary Restriction and Prohibition of Traffic) Order (SI 2011/506)
- The A31 Trunk Road (Verwood Interchange – Bere Regis Roundabout) (Temporary Restriction and Prohibition of Traffic) Order (SI 2011/507)
- The A30 Trunk Road (Carminow to Helland, Bodmin) (Temporary Restriction of Traffic) Order (SI 2011/508)
- The A64 Trunk Road (Musley Bank Interchange to Pickering Interchange) (Temporary Restriction and Prohibition of Traffic) Order (SI 2011/509)
- The A1 Trunk Road (Denton Burn Interchange to Scotswood Interchange) (Temporary Restriction and Prohibition of Traffic) Order (SI 2011/510)
- The A14 Trunk Road (Junction 15 Bythorn, Cambridgeshire) (Temporary Prohibition of Traffic) Order (SI 2011/511)
- The A120 Trunk Road (Marks Farm Roundabout, Braintree, Essex) (Temporary 40 Miles Per Hour Speed Restriction) Order (SI 2011/512)
- The A1(M) Motorway (Junction 47 to Junction 46) (Temporary Prohibition of Traffic) Order (SI 2011/513)
- The M25 Motorway and the A282 Trunk Road (Junctions 28 – 31) (Temporary Restriction and Prohibition of Traffic) Order (SI 2011/514)
- The A259 Trunk Road (Bexhill) (Temporary 50 Miles Per Hour Speed Restriction) Order (SI 2011/515)
- The A259 Trunk Road (Rye) (Temporary 30 Miles Per Hour Speed Restriction) Order (SI 2011/516)
- The Armed Forces and Reserve Forces (Compensation Scheme) Order (SI 2011/517)
- The National Health Service (Charges for Drugs and Appliances) Amendment Regulations (SI 2011/518)
- The National Health Service (Dental Charges) Amendment Regulations (SI 2011/519)
- The Personal Injuries (NHS Charges) (Amounts) Amendment Regulations (SI 2011/520)
- The A120 Trunk Road (Great Dunmow, Essex) (Vehicle Height Restriction) Order (SI 2011/521)
- The A36 Trunk Road (Warminster Road, Bathampton, to Norton St Philip, Somerset) (Temporary Prohibition and Restriction of Traffic) Order (SI 2011/522)
- The A40 Trunk Road (Lay-by opposite Cotts Farm, Robeston Wathen, Pembrokeshire) (Prohibition of Right Hand Turns and Prohibition of Entry to Vehicles) Order (SI 2011/523)
- The A36 Trunk Road (Warminster Road, Bath) (Temporary Prohibition of Traffic) Order (SI 2011/524)
- The A38 Trunk Road (Dartbridge Junction, Buckfastleigh, to Forder Valley Junction, Plymouth) (Temporary Prohibition and Restriction of Traffic) Order (SI 2011/525)
- The A303 Trunk Road (Ilchester to Sparkford, Somerset (Temporary Prohibition of Traffic) Order (SI 2011/526)
- The M53 Motorway (Junctions 5-1 Northbound and Southbound Carriageways and Slip Roads) (Temporary Prohibition and Restriction of Traffic) Order (SI 2011/527)
- The Council Tax and Non-Domestic Rating (Amendment) (Wales) Regulations (SI 2011/528)
- The A470 Trunk Road (Southbound Carriageway between Abercynon Roundabout and Broadway Interchange, Rhondda Cynon Taf) (Temporary Prohibition of Vehicles) Order (SI 2011/529)
- The M5 Motorway (Junction 16 Southbound Entry Slip Road) (Temporary Prohibition of Traffic) Order (SI 2011/530)
- The A40 Trunk Road (West of Carmarthen, Carmarthenshire) (Temporary Traffic Restrictions & Prohibition) Order (SI 2011/531)
- The A417 Trunk Road (Air Balloon Roundabout to Brockworth, Crickley Hill, Gloucestershire) (Temporary Prohibition of Traffic) Order (SI 2011/532)
- The M42 Motorway (Junction 5) (Slip Roads) (Temporary Restriction and Prohibition of Traffic) Order (SI 2011/533)
- The A45 Trunk Road (M42 Junction 6) (Temporary Prohibition of Traffic) Order (SI 2011/534)
- The M50 Motorway (Junctions 2 to 4) (Temporary Prohibition of Traffic) Order (SI 2011/535)
- The A52 Trunk Road (Brian Clough Way, Derby) (Temporary Prohibition of Traffic) Order (SI 2011/536)
- The A494/A550 Trunk Road (Queensferry Interchange to Deeside Industrial Park Interchange, Flintshire) (Temporary Traffic Restriction & Prohibitions) Order (SI 2011/537)
- The A14 Trunk Road (M1 Junction 19 to Thrapston) (Temporary Restriction and Prohibition of Traffic) Order (SI 2011/538)
- The A38 Trunk Road (Coxbench to Little Eaton, Derbyshire) (Temporary Prohibition of Traffic) Order (SI 2011/539)
- The M42 Motorway (Junctions 4 to 6) (Temporary Prohibition of Traffic) Order (SI 2011/540)
- The M5 and M6 Motorways (M6 Junction 8) (Ray Hall Interchange) (Temporary Prohibition of Traffic) Order (SI 2011/541)
- The M5 Motorway (Junctions 8 to 9) (Temporary Prohibition of Traffic) Order (SI 2011/542)
- The Export Control (Amendment) Order (SI 2011/543)
- The Accession (Immigration and Worker Registration) (Revocation, Savings and Consequential Provisions) Regulations (SI 2011/544)
- The M6 Motorway (Junctions 3a – 3) (Temporary Restriction and Prohibition of Traffic) Order (SI 2011/545)
- The A43 Trunk Road (M1 Junction 15a, Northampton) (Derestriction) Order (SI 2011/546)
- The Immigration (Designation of Travel Bans) (Amendment) Order (SI 2011/547)
- The Libya (Financial Sanctions) Order (SI 2011/548)
- The London Thames Gateway Development Corporation (Planning Functions) (Amendment) Order (SI 2011/549)
- The Town and Country Planning (Mayor of London) (Amendment) Order (SI 2011/550)
- The Recycling, Preparation for Re-use and Composting Targets (Definitions) (Wales) Order (SI 2011/551)
- The Care Standards Act 2000 (Enforcement of Care Standards) (Notification) (England) Regulations (SI 2011/552)
- Her Majesty's Chief Inspector of Education, Children's Services and Skills (Fees and Frequency of Inspections) (Children's Homes etc.) (Amendment) Regulations (SI 2011/553)
- The Pension Protection Fund (Revaluation Amendments) Regulations (SI 2011/554)
- The Marine Licensing (Application Fees) (Wales) Regulations (SI 2011/555)
- The Marine and Coastal Access Act 2009 (Commencement No.5, Consequential and Transitional Provisions) Order (SI 2011/556)
- The Marine Licensing (Register of Licensing Information) (Wales) Regulations (SI 2011/557)
- The Fire and Rescue Authorities (Performance Indicators) (Wales) Order (SI 2011/558)
- The Marine Licensing (Exempted Activities) (Wales) Order (SI 2011/559)
- The West Northamptonshire Development Corporation (Planning Functions) (Amendment) Order (SI 2011/560)
- The Local Government Pension Scheme (Benefits, Membership and Contributions) (Amendment) Regulations (SI 2011/561)
- The Local Elections (Parishes and Communities) (England and Wales) (Amendment) Rules (SI 2011/562)
- The Local Elections (Principal Areas) (England and Wales) (Amendment) Rules (SI 2011/563)
- The Marine Licensing (Application Fees) Regulations (SI 2011/564)
- The Protection of Vulnerable Groups (Scotland) Act 2007 (Consequential Modifications) Order (SI 2011/565)
- The A11 Trunk Road (Station Lane, Ketteringham, Norfolk) (Closure of Gaps in the Central Reservation) Order (SI 2011/566)
- The A5 Trunk Road (Old Stratford, Northamptonshire) (Derestriction) Order (SI 2011/567)
- The A38 Trunk Road (M1 Junction 28, Derbyshire) (Derestriction) Order (SI 2011/568)
- The A23 Trunk Road (M23 Junction 11, Slip Road) (Temporary Restriction of Traffic) Order (SI 2011/569)
- The M27 Motorway (Junction 9, Westbound Exit Slip Road) (Temporary Prohibition of Traffic) Order (SI 2011/570)
- The M25 Motorway and the A2 and A282 Trunk Roads (Junctions 1B – 5) (Temporary Prohibition of Traffic) Order (SI 2011/571)
- The A1(M) Motorway (South of Junction 9, Hertfordshire to North of Junction 10, Bedfordshire) (Temporary Restriction and Prohibition of Traffic) Order (SI 2011/572)
- The A45 Trunk Road (near Wellingborough, Northamptonshire) (Temporary Prohibition of Traffic) Order (SI 2011/573)
- The A428 Trunk Road (A1/B1428 Great North Road Roundabout, North of Wyboston, Bedfordshire to B1043 Barford Road Roundabout, St Neots, Cambridgeshire) (Temporary 40 Miles Per Hour Speed Restriction) Order (SI 2011/574)
- The A43 Trunk Road (Brackley Bypass) (Temporary Prohibition of Traffic) Order (SI 2011/575)
- The Scottish Parliament (Regional Returning Officers) Order (SI 2011/576)
- The Children and Families (Wales) Measure 2010 (Commencement No.2, Savings and Transitional Provisions) (Amendment) and (Consequential Amendments) Order (SI 2011/577)
- The A470 Trunk Road (Slip Roads at Taffs Well and Upper Boat Interchanges, Rhondda Cynon Taf) (Temporary Prohibition of Vehicles) Order (SI 2011/578)
- The A55 Trunk Road (Junction 35, Dobs Hill, Flintshire, Westbound Carriageway and Westbound Off Slip Road) (Temporary Prohibitions and 40 MPH Speed Limit) Order (SI 2011/579)
- The Export Control (Amendment) ( 2) Order (SI 2011/580)
- The Fostering Services (England) Regulations (SI 2011/581)
- The Arrangements for Placement of Children by Voluntary Organisations and Others (England) Regulations (SI 2011/582)
- The Children's Homes (Amendment) Regulations (SI 2011/583)
- The Childcare (Exemptions from Registration) (Amendment) Order (SI 2011/584)
- The A55 Trunk Road (Junction 35, Dobs Hill, Flintshire, Eastbound Carriageway and Eastbound Off Slip Road) (Temporary Prohibitions and 40 MPH Speed Limit) Order (SI 2011/585)
- The Civil Proceedings Fees (Amendment) Order (SI 2011/586)
- The Family Proceedings Fees (Amendment) Order (SI 2011/587)
- The Non-Contentious Probate Fees (Amendment) Order (SI 2011/588)
- The Adoption Agencies and Independent Review of Determinations (Amendment) Regulations (SI 2011/589)
- The A494 Trunk Road (Llanelidan Junction to Clawdd Poncen, Denbighshire) (Temporary Traffic Restrictions and Prohibition) Order (SI 2011/590)
- The National Health Service Pension Scheme (Amendment) Regulations (SI 2011/591)
- The A45 Trunk Road (Thrapston to Northampton, Northamptonshire) (Derestriction) Order (SI 2011/592)
- The Mutual Societies (Electronic Communications) Order (SI 2011/593)
- The Welsh Forms of Oaths and Affirmations (Government of Wales Act 2006) (Amendment) Order (SI 2011/594)
- The A36 Trunk Road (Wilton Road, Salisbury, Wiltshire) (Prohibition and Restriction of Waiting, Loading and Unloading) Order 1988 (Variation) Order (SI 2011/595)
- The M1 Motorway and the A5 Trunk Road (M1 Junction 18) (Temporary Prohibition of Traffic) Order (SI 2011/596)
- The M40 Motorway (Junction 8a, Oxfordshire) Southbound Slip Roads (Temporary Prohibition of Traffic) Order (SI 2011/597)
- The A500 Trunk Road (Hanford, Stoke-on-Trent, Staffordshire) (Temporary Prohibition of Traffic in Layby) Order (SI 2011/598)
- The A23 Trunk Road (Bolney – Warninglid, Slip Roads) (Temporary Prohibition of Traffic) Order (SI 2011/599)
- The Animal By-Products (Enforcement) (Wales) Regulations (SI 2011/600)

== 601–700 ==
- The Data Protection Act 1998 (Commencement 3) Order (SI 2011/601)
- The Education (Head Teachers’ Qualifications) (England) (Amendment) Regulations (SI 2011/602)
- The Marine and Coastal Access Act 2009 (Transitional and Savings Provisions) Order (SI 2011/603)
- The A3 Trunk Road (Hog's Back Interchange, Southbound Exit Slip Road) (Temporary Prohibition of Traffic) Order (SI 2011/604)
- The Libya (Asset-Freezing) Regulations (SI 2011/605)
- The A12 Trunk Road (Bascule Bridge and Station Square, Lowestoft, Suffolk) (Temporary Prohibition of Traffic and Pedestrians) Order (SI 2011/606)
- The A590 Trunk Road (Backbarrow) (Temporary Restriction and Prohibition of Traffic) Order (SI 2011/607)
- The M58 Motorway (Junctions 1–6 Eastbound and Westbound Carriageways and Slip Roads) (Temporary Prohibition and Restriction of Traffic) Order (SI 2011/608)
- The M66 Motorway (Junction 2 to the A56, Northbound and Southbound Carriageways and Slip Roads) (Temporary Prohibition of Traffic) Order (SI 2011/609)
- The Air Navigation (Restriction of Flying) (Royal Wedding) Regulations (SI 2011/610)
- The A55 Trunk Road Junction 36 (to be re-numbered Junction 37) Connecting Roads (Temporary Prohibition of Traffic) Order (SI 2011/611)
- The A1 Trunk Road (Gateshead Quays Interchange) (Temporary Prohibition of Traffic) Order (SI 2011/612)
- The M62 Motorway (Junction 32, Castleford) (Temporary Prohibition of Traffic) Order (SI 2011/613)
- The Teachers’ Pensions (Miscellaneous Amendments) Regulations (SI 2011/614)
- The Civil Contingencies Act 2004 (Contingency Planning) (Amendment) Regulations (SI 2011/615)
- The Climate Change Levy (Fuel Use and Recycling Processes) (Amendment) Regulations (SI 2011/616)
- The A55 Trunk Road (Pen-y-clip Tunnel, Conwy County Borough) (Temporary Traffic Restriction & Prohibitions) Order (SI 2011/617)
- The A180 Trunk Road (Layby at Stallingborough Interchange) (Temporary Prohibition of Traffic) Order (SI 2011/618)
- The M40 and M42 Motorways (M42 Junction 3a to Junction 4) (Temporary Restriction and Prohibition of Traffic) ( 2) Order (SI 2011/619)
- The A46 Trunk Road (West of Stratford-upon-Avon, Warwickshire) (Temporary Restriction and Prohibition of Traffic) Order (SI 2011/620)
- The Immigration (Designation of Travel Bans) (Amendment No.2) Order (SI 2011/621)
- The M6 Motorway (Junction 7) (Temporary Prohibition of Traffic) Order (SI 2011/622)
- The M42 Motorway (Junction 7a) (Link Road) (Temporary Prohibition of Traffic) Order (SI 2011/623)
- The National Health Service Trusts (Originating Capital) Order (SI 2011/624)
- The Conservation of Habitats and Species (Amendment) Regulations (SI 2011/625)
- The Official Feed and Food Controls (Wales) (Amendment) Regulations (SI 2011/626)
- The Marine Licensing (Delegation of Functions) Order (SI 2011/627)
- The Gender Recognition (Application Fees) (Amendment) Order (SI 2011/628)
- The Food (Jelly Mini-Cups) (Emergency Control) (Wales) (Revocation) Regulations (SI 2011/629)
- The Driver and Vehicle Licensing Agency Trading Fund (Revocation) Order (SI 2011/630)
- The Terrorism Act 2000 (Remedial) Order (SI 2011/631)
- The National Assembly for Wales (Returning Officers' Charges) Order (SI 2011/632)
- The Justices’ Clerks (Amendment) Rules (SI 2011/633)
- The Social Security (Deferral of Retirement Pensions) Regulations (SI 2011/634)
- The A49 Trunk Road (Hope under Dinmore to Holmer, Herefordshire) (Temporary Prohibition of Traffic) Order (SI 2011/635)
- The M5 Motorway (Junction 6 to Junction 7, Worcestershire) (Temporary Prohibition of Traffic) Order (SI 2011/636)
- The M6 Motorway (Junction 1) (Temporary Prohibition of Traffic) Order (SI 2011/637)
- The M6 Motorway (Junctions 14 to 16) (Temporary Prohibition of Traffic) Order (SI 2011/638)
- The A66 Trunk Road (Blands Corner Roundabout) (Temporary 40 Miles Per Hour Speed Restriction) Order (SI 2011/639)
- The M56 Motorway (Junctions 9-8 Eastbound Carriageway) (Temporary Prohibition and Restriction of Traffic) Order (SI 2011/640)
- The M55 Motorway (Junctions 3–4 Westbound and Eastbound Carriageways) (Temporary Restriction and Prohibition of Traffic) Order (SI 2011/641)
- The M6 Motorway Junction 20, Southbound (Link Roads to the M56 Eastbound and Westbound) and Junction 21 Entry Slip Road (Temporary Prohibition of Traffic) Order (SI 2011/642)
- The A303 Trunk Road (Hayes End Roundabout, South Petherton) (40 mph Speed Limit and Derestriction) Order (SI 2011/643)
- The A1(M) Motorway (Junction 56, Barton) (Temporary Restriction and Prohibition of Traffic) Order (SI 2011/644)
- The A66 Trunk Road (Bluegrass Junction to Banks Gate and Barras Junction) (Temporary Prohibition and Restriction of Traffic) Order (SI 2011/645)
- The Closure of Prisons Order (SI 2011/646)
- The M6 Motorway (Junctions 32–33, Northbound and Southbound Carriageways) (Temporary Restriction of Traffic) Order (SI 2011/647)
- The M55 Motorway (Junction 3, Westbound Carriageway and Junction 3 Westbound Entry Slip Road) (Temporary Prohibition and Restriction of Traffic) Order (SI 2011/648)
- The M6 Motorway (Junctions 37–40, Northbound and Southbound Carriageways) (Temporary Restriction of Traffic) Order (SI 2011/649)
- The Air Navigation (Dangerous Goods) (Amendment) Regulations (SI 2011/650)
- The Tribunal Procedure (Amendment) Rules (SI 2011/651)
- The M6 Motorway (Junctions 43–44, Northbound Carriageway) (Temporary Restriction of Traffic) Order (SI 2011/652)
- The A23 Trunk Road (A264/M23 Junction 11) (Temporary Prohibition of Traffic) Order (SI 2011/653)
- The M1 Motorway (Junctions 1 – 4, Slip Roads) (Temporary Prohibition of Traffic) Order (SI 2011/654)
- The Food Additives (Wales) (Amendment) Regulations (SI 2011/655)
- The Home Energy Efficiency Schemes (Wales) Regulations (SI 2011/656)
- The Cardiff and Vale College Further Education Corporation (Government) Regulations (SI 2011/657)
- The Higher Education Act 2004 (Relevant Authority) (Designation) (Wales) Regulations (SI 2011/658)
- The Cardiff and Vale College (Incorporation) Order (SI 2011/659)
- The Venture Capital Trust (Winding up and Mergers) (Tax) (Amendment) Regulations (SI 2011/660)
- The Insurance Premium Tax (Discounted Insurance Premiums: Higher Rate) Order (SI 2011/661)
- The Finance ( 3) Act 2010, Schedule 2 (Appointed Day) Order (SI 2011/662)
- The Offshore Installations (Safety Zones) Order (SI 2011/663)
- The Pensions Act 2008 (Commencement 9) Order (SI 2011/664)
- The Stamp Duty and Stamp Duty Reserve Tax (Investment Exchanges and Clearing Houses) (Revocation) Regulations (SI 2011/665)
- The Stamp Duty and Stamp Duty Reserve Tax (Eurex Clearing AG) Regulations (SI 2011/666)
- The Stamp Duty and Stamp Duty Reserve Tax (European Central Counterparty Limited) Regulations (SI 2011/667)
- The Stamp Duty and Stamp Duty Reserve Tax (European Multilateral Clearing Facility N.V.) Regulations (SI 2011/668)
- The Stamp Duty and Stamp Duty Reserve Tax (LCH.Clearnet Limited) Regulations (SI 2011/669)
- The Stamp Duty and Stamp Duty Reserve Tax (SIX X-CLEAR AG) Regulations (SI 2011/670)
- The Pension Protection Fund (Prescribed Payments and Investment Costs – Amendment) Regulations (SI 2011/671)
- The Occupational and Personal Pension Schemes (Miscellaneous Amendments) Regulations (SI 2011/672)
- The Application of Pension Legislation to the National Employment Savings Trust Corporation Regulations (SI 2011/673)
- The Social Security (Miscellaneous Amendments) Regulations (SI 2011/674)
- The Child Poverty Strategy (Wales) Regulations (SI 2011/675)
- The National Assembly for Wales (Returning Officers' Accounts) Regulations (SI 2011/676)
- The Digital Switchover (Disclosure of Information) Act 2007 (Prescription of Information) (Amendment) Order (SI 2011/677)
- The Additional Statutory Paternity Pay (General) (Amendment) Regulations (SI 2011/678)
- The Social Security (Claims and Payments) Amendment Regulations (SI 2011/679)
- The National Health Service (General Medical Services Contracts) (Prescription of Drugs etc.) (Amendment) Regulations (SI 2011/680)
- The National Health Service (Travelling Expenses and Remission of Charges) (Wales) (Amendment) Regulations (SI 2011/681)
- The Welfare Reform Act 2009 (Commencement 4) Order (SI 2011/682)
- The Pembrokeshire (Communities) Order (SI 2011/683)
- The Climate Change Levy (General) (Amendment) Regulations (SI 2011/684)
- The National Lottery etc. Act 1993 (Amendment of Section 23) Order (SI 2011/685)
- The Employers’ Liability (Compulsory Insurance) (Amendment) Regulations (SI 2011/686)
- The A5 and A55 Trunk Roads (Junction 11 (Llys y Gwynt Roundabout) to A4244 Roundabout, Gwynedd) (Temporary Traffic Restrictions & Prohibition) Order (SI 2011/687)
- The Jobseeker's Allowance (Mandatory Work Activity Scheme) Regulations (SI 2011/688)
- The Alder Hey Children's NHS Foundation Trust (Transfer of Trust Property) Order (SI 2011/689)
- The Further Education Teachers’ Qualifications (England) (Amendment) Regulations (SI 2011/690)
- The Student Fees (Qualifying Courses and Persons) (Wales) Regulations (SI 2011/691)
- The Tuberculosis (Wales) Order (SI 2011/692)
- The Badger (Control Area) (Wales) Order (SI 2011/693)
- The Flood and Water Management Act 2010 (Commencement 3 and Transitional Provisions) Order (SI 2011/694)
- The Regional Flood and Coastal Committees (England and Wales) Regulations (SI 2011/695)
- The Environment Agency (Levies) (England and Wales) Regulations (SI 2011/696)
- The Flood Risk Management Overview and Scrutiny Committee (England) Regulations (SI 2011/697)
- The Loan Relationships and Derivative Contracts (Disregard and Bringing into Account of Profits and Losses) (Amendment) Regulations (SI 2011/698)
- The Visits to Former Looked After Children in Detention (Wales) Regulations (SI 2011/699)
- The Fruit Juices and Fruit Nectars (Wales) (Amendment) Regulations (SI 2011/700)

== 701–800 ==
- The Finance Act 2009, Sections 101 to 103 (Income Tax Self Assessment) (Appointed Days and Transitional and Consequential Provisions) Order (SI 2011/701)
- The Finance Act 2009, Schedules 55 and 56 (Income Tax Self Assessment and Pension Schemes) (Appointed Days and Consequential and Savings Provisions) Order (SI 2011/702)
- The Finance ( 3) Act 2010, Schedules 10 and 11 (Income Tax Self Assessment and Pension Schemes) (Appointed Days) Order (SI 2011/703)
- The National Health Service (Concerns, Complaints and Redress Arrangements) (Wales) Regulations (SI 2011/704)
- The Planning Act 2008 (Commencement 6) Order (SI 2011/705)
- The Education (Remission of Charges Relating to Residential Trips) (Wales) (Amendment) Regulations (SI 2011/706)
- The Breaks for Carers of Disabled Children Regulations (SI 2011/707)
- The National Assistance (Assessment of Resources and Sums for Personal Requirements) (Amendment) (Wales) Regulations (SI 2011/708)
- The National Insurance Contributions Credits (Miscellaneous Amendments) Regulations (SI 2011/709)
- The Education (Free School Lunches) (Prescribed Tax Credits) (Wales) (Amendment) Order (SI 2011/710)
- The Taxes, etc. (Fees for Payment by Internet) Regulations (SI 2011/711)
- The Qualifying Care Relief (Specified Social Care Schemes) Order (SI 2011/712)
- The Firearms (Electronic Communications) Order (SI 2011/713)
- The Smoke Control Areas (Exempted Fireplaces) (England) Order (SI 2011/714)
- The Smoke Control Areas (Authorised Fuels) (England) (Amendment) Regulations (SI 2011/715)
- The Prevention of Terrorism Act 2005 (Continuance in Force of Sections 1 to 9) Order (SI 2011/716)
- The Police Act 1997 (Criminal Records and Registration) (Jersey) (Amendment) Regulations (SI 2011/717)
- The Police Act 1997 (Criminal Records and Registration) (Guernsey) (Amendment) Regulations (SI 2011/718)
- The Police Act 1997 (Criminal Records) (Amendment) Regulations (SI 2011/719)
- The Legal Services Act 2007 (Commencement 10) Order (SI 2011/720)
- The Tax Credits (Miscellaneous Amendments) Regulations (SI 2011/721)
- The Coroners and Justice Act 2009 (Commencement 4, Transitional and Saving Provisions) (Amendment) Order (SI 2011/722)
- The Government Resources and Accounts Act 2000 (Estimates and Accounts) Order (SI 2011/723)
- The National Assistance (Sums for Personal Requirements) Amendment (England) Regulations (SI 2011/724)
- The Statutory Maternity Pay (Compensation of Employers) Amendment Regulations (SI 2011/725)
- The Pension Protection Fund (Pensions on Divorce etc.: Charges) Regulations (SI 2011/726)
- The Greenhouse Gas Emissions Trading Scheme (Amendment) (Fees) and National Emissions Inventory Regulations (SI 2011/727)
- The Education (Free School Lunches) (Prescribed Tax Credits) (England) (Amendment) Order (SI 2011/728)
- The Income Tax (Pay As You Earn) (Amendment) Regulations (SI 2011/729)
- The Education (Residential Trips) (Prescribed Tax Credits) (England) (Amendment) Regulations (SI 2011/730)
- The Pension Protection Fund (Pension Compensation Sharing and Attachment on Divorce etc.) Regulations (SI 2011/731)
- The Taxation of Pension Schemes (Transitional Provisions) (Amendment) Order (SI 2011/732)
- The Registered Pension Schemes (Transfer of Sums and Assets) (Amendment) Regulations (SI 2011/733)
- The Independent Health Care (Wales) Regulations (SI 2011/734)
- The Marine Works (Environmental Impact Assessment) (Amendment) Regulations (SI 2011/735)
- The Assembly Learning Grants (European Institutions) (Wales) Regulations (SI 2011/736)
- The A470 Trunk Road (Moat Lane Level Crossing, Nr. Caersws, Powys) (Temporary Prohibition of Vehicles) Order (SI 2011/737)
- The Consular Fees Order (SI 2011/738)
- The Transfer of Functions (Big Lottery Fund) Order (SI 2011/739)
- The Transfer of Functions (Report on the Civil Estate) Order (SI 2011/740)
- The Transfer of Functions (Media and Telecommunications etc.) Order (SI 2011/741)
- The European Union (Definition of Treaties) (Stabilisation and Association Agreement) (Republic of Serbia) Order (SI 2011/742)
- The European Union (Definition of Treaties) (Partnership and Cooperation Agreement) (Republic of Indonesia) Order (SI 2011/743)
- The Misuse of Drugs Act 1971 (Amendment) Order (SI 2011/744)
- The Health and Safety at Work etc. Act 1974 (Application outside Great Britain) (Variation) Order (SI 2011/745)
- The A52 Trunk Road (Clifton Boulevard, Nottingham) (Link Road) (Temporary Prohibition of Traffic) Order (SI 2011/747)
- The Tunisia (Restrictive Measures) (Overseas Territories) Order (SI 2011/748)
- The Terrorist Asset-Freezing etc. Act 2010 (Isle of Man) Order (SI 2011/749)
- The Terrorist Asset-Freezing etc. Act 2010 (Overseas Territories) Order (SI 2011/750)
- The Parliamentary Commissioner Order (SI 2011/751)
- The National Assembly for Wales (Letters Patent) Order (SI 2011/752)
- The A40 Trunk Road (Letterston, Pembrokeshire) (Temporary Traffic Restrictions and Prohibition) Order (SI 2011/753)
- The A477 Trunk Road (Near Red Roses, Carmarthenshire and Pembrokeshire) (Temporary Traffic Restrictions and Prohibition) Order (SI 2011/754)
- The A477 Trunk Road (West of Broadmoor, Pembrokeshire) (Temporary Traffic Restrictions and Prohibition) Order (SI 2011/755)
- The A483 Trunk Road (Bridge Street, Llandeilo, Carmarthenshire) (Temporary Waiting Restrictions) Order (SI 2011/756)
- The A259 Trunk Road (West of Bexhill) (Temporary 40 Miles Per Hour Speed Restriction) Order (SI 2011/757)
- The Sea Fishing (Penalty Notices) (England) Order (SI 2011/758)
- The M4 Motorway (Junctions 1 – 3) (Temporary Prohibition of Traffic) Order (SI 2011/759)
- The A3 Trunk Road (North of Ham Barn Roundabout) (Temporary Prohibition of Traffic) Order (SI 2011/760)
- The London Insolvency District (Central London County Court) Order (SI 2011/761)
- The A3 Trunk Road (Wisley Interchange, Southbound Exit Slip Road) (Temporary Prohibition of Traffic) Order (SI 2011/762)
- The A23 Trunk Road (Slaugham, Northbound Lay-By) (Temporary Prohibition of Traffic) Order (SI 2011/763)
- The A47 Trunk Road (Honingham Roundabout, Norfolk) (Temporary Restriction and Prohibition of Traffic) Order (SI 2011/764)
- The Aviation Greenhouse Gas Emissions Trading Scheme (Amendment) Regulations (SI 2011/765)
- The Air Navigation (Restriction of Flying) (Southend) Regulations (SI 2011/766)
- The M20 Motorway (Junctions 4 – 8) (Temporary Prohibition of Traffic) Order (SI 2011/767)
- The A27 Trunk Road (Holmbush Interchange to Hangleton) (Temporary Prohibition of Traffic) (Routine Maintenance Work) Order (SI 2011/768)
- The A259 Trunk Road (Little Common Road, Bexhill) (30 Miles Per Hour Speed Limit) Order (SI 2011/769)
- The A14 Trunk Road (Junction 50 Cedars Interchange to Junction 51 Beacon Hill Interchange, Suffolk) (Temporary Restriction and Prohibition of Traffic) Order (SI 2011/770)
- The A616 Trunk Road (Deepcar Junction, Stockbridge) (Temporary Restriction and Prohibition of Traffic) Order (SI 2011/771)
- The A14 Trunk Road (Junction 44 Moreton Hall Interchange to East of Junction 43 St. Saviours Interchange, Bury St. Edmunds, Suffolk) (Temporary Restriction and Prohibition of Traffic) Order (SI 2011/772)
- The M18 Motorway and the M1 Motorway (Thurcroft Interchange) (Temporary Prohibition of Traffic) Order (SI 2011/773)
- The A14 Trunk Road (Ipswich Southern Bypass, South of Copdock Interchange Junction 55 to Nacton Interchange Junction 57, Suffolk) (Temporary Restriction and Prohibition of Traffic Order (SI 2011/774)
- The Income Tax (Qualifying Child Care) Regulations (SI 2011/775)
- The Former Equality Commissions’ Codes of Practice (Employment, Equal Pay, and Rights of Access for Disabled Persons) (Revocation) Order (SI 2011/776)
- The Finance ( 3) Act 2010, Schedule 13 (Record Keeping, Time Limits and Information and Inspection Powers) (Appointed Day and Transitional Provision) Order (SI 2011/777)
- The School Finance (England) (Amendment) Regulations (SI 2011/778)
- The A487 Trunk Road (Cardigan, Ceredigion) (Temporary 40 mph Speed Limit) Order (SI 2011/779)
- The Divorce and Dissolution etc. (Pension Protection Fund) Regulations (SI 2011/780)
- The Child Trust Funds (Amendment) Regulations (SI 2011/781)
- The Individual Savings Account (Amendment) Regulations (SI 2011/782)
- The National Savings Bank (Amendment) Regulations (SI 2011/783)
- The Education (Student Loans) (Repayment) (Amendment) Regulations (SI 2011/784)
- The Insolvency (Amendment) Rules (SI 2011/785)
- The Social Security (Deferral of Retirement Pensions) (Amendment) Regulations (SI 2011/786)
- The M42 Motorway (Junction 6 to Junction 7) (Temporary Prohibition of Traffic) Order (SI 2011/787)
- The A449 and A40 Trunk Roads (Travellers Rest Roundabout to Over Ross Roundabout, Herefordshire) (Temporary 10 Miles Per Hour and 40 Miles Per Hour Speed Limit) Order (SI 2011/788)
- The Jobseeker's Allowance (Work Experience) (Amendment) Regulations (SI 2011/789)
- The Immigration and Nationality (Cost Recovery Fees) Regulations (SI 2011/790)
- The Walsall Hospitals National Health Service Trust (Establishment) Amendment Order (SI 2011/791)
- The A500 Trunk Road (Etruria, Stoke-on-Trent) (Temporary Prohibition of Traffic) Order (SI 2011/792)
- The M42 Motorway (Junction 3) (Slip Roads) (Temporary Prohibition of Traffic) Order (SI 2011/793)
- The A66 Trunk Road (Cross Lanes to Neasham Grange) (Temporary Restriction and Prohibition of Traffic) Order (SI 2011/794)
- The A1(M) Motorway (Junction 58 to Junction 59) (Temporary 50 Miles Per Hour Speed Restriction) Order (SI 2011/795)
- The Thames Regional Flood Defence Committee (Amendment) Order (SI 2011/796)
- The Social Security (Contributions) (Amendment 3) Regulations (SI 2011/797)
- The Derbyshire Community Health Services National Health Service Trust (Establishment) Order (SI 2011/798)
- The Hounslow and Richmond Community Healthcare National Health Service Trust (Establishment) Order (SI 2011/799)
- The Leeds Community Healthcare National Health Service Trust (Establishment) Order (SI 2011/800)

== 801–900 ==
- The Guaranteed Minimum Pensions Increase Order (SI 2011/801)
- The Lincolnshire Community Health Services National Health Service Trust (Establishment) Order (SI 2011/802)
- The A38 Trunk Road (Harcombe, Near Exeter) (Temporary Prohibition and Restriction of Traffic) Order (SI 2011/803)
- The Solent National Health Service Trust (Establishment) Order (SI 2011/804)
- The Wirral Community National Health Service Trust (Establishment) Order (SI 2011/805)
- The A55 Trunk Road (Eastbound On Slip Road at Junction 33, Northop Interchange, Flintshire) (Temporary Prohibition of Vehicles, Cyclists & Pedestrians) Order (SI 2011/806)
- The A55 Trunk Road (Eastbound Carriageway at Junction 24 (Faenol Interchange), Abergele, Conwy) (Temporary Traffic Restriction & Prohibitions) Order (SI 2011/807)
- The A1 Trunk Road (Seaton Burn to Stannington) (Temporary Restriction and Prohibition of Traffic) Order (SI 2011/808)
- The A1 Trunk Road (Felton to Causey Park Bridge) (Temporary Restriction and Prohibition of Traffic) Order (SI 2011/809)
- The Amalgamation of the Foss Internal Drainage District and the Wilberfoss and Thornton Level Drainage District Order (SI 2011/810)
- The Personal Injuries (Civilians) Scheme (Amendment) Order (SI 2011/811)
- The A63 Trunk Road (Daltry Street Interchange to Mytongate Gyratory) (Temporary Prohibition of Traffic) Order (SI 2011/812)
- The A30 Trunk Road (Sourton Cross to Launceston) (Temporary Prohibition and Restriction of Traffic) Order (SI 2011/813)
- The Drysides Internal Drainage District and Whittlesey Internal Drainage District (Amalgamation) Order (SI 2011/814)
- The A45 Trunk Road (near Bickenhill, Solihull) (Slip Roads) (Temporary Prohibition of Traffic) Order (SI 2011/815)
- The A14 Trunk Road (Rothwell to Kettering, Northamptonshire) (Temporary Restriction and Prohibition of Traffic) Order (SI 2011/816)
- The Accounts and Audit (England) Regulations (SI 2011/817)
- The Scunthorpe and Gainsborough Water Management Board Order (SI 2011/818)
- The Isle of Axholme and North Nottinghamshire Water Level Management Board Order (SI 2011/819)
- The Ainsty (2008) Internal Drainage Board Order (SI 2011/820)
- The Social Security Benefits Up-rating Order (SI 2011/821)
- The United Kingdom Space Agency (Transfer of Property etc.) Order (SI 2011/822)
- The Children Act 1989 (Higher Education Bursary) (Wales) Regulations (SI 2011/823)
- The Children and Young Persons Act 2008 (Commencement 5) (Wales) Order (SI 2011/824)
- The Export Control (Libya) Order (SI 2011/825)
- The Pensions Increase (Modification) Regulations (SI 2011/826)
- The Pensions Increase (Review) Order (SI 2011/827)
- The Airport Byelaws (Designation) Order (SI 2011/828)
- The Apprenticeships, Skills, Children and Learning Act 2009 (Commencement 3) (Wales) Order (SI 2011/829)
- The Social Security Benefits Up-rating Regulations (SI 2011/830)
- The Community Care, Services for Carers and Children's Services (Direct Payments) (Wales) Regulations (SI 2011/831)
- The Aerodromes (Designation) (Detention and Sale of Aircraft) (England and Wales) (Amendment) Order (SI 2011/832)
- The Home Energy Efficiency Scheme (England) (Amendment) Regulations (SI 2011/833)
- The A38 Trunk Road (Trerulefoot to Liskeard, Cornwall) (Temporary Prohibition and Restriction of Traffic) Order (SI 2011/834)
- The A35 Trunk Road (Puddletown, Dorset) (Temporary Prohibition of Traffic) Order (SI 2011/835)
- The M5 Motorway (Junction 21 Northbound Exit Slip Road) (Temporary Prohibition of Traffic) Order (SI 2011/836)
- The M4 Motorway (Junction 18 Eastbound Exit Slip Road) (Temporary Prohibition of Traffic) Order (SI 2011/837)
- The A6 and A5111 Trunk Roads (Alvaston Bypass, Derby) (Temporary Prohibition of Traffic) Order (SI 2011/838)
- The Financial Assistance Scheme (Revaluation and Indexation Amendments) Regulations (SI 2011/839)
- The Pension Protection Fund (Pension Compensation Cap) Order (SI 2011/840)
- The Occupational Pension Schemes (Levy Ceiling) Order (SI 2011/841)
- The M54 Motorway (Junctions 6 – 7) (Temporary Restriction and Prohibition of Traffic) Order (SI 2011/842)
- The Air Navigation (Restriction of Flying) (Duxford) Regulations (SI 2011/843)
- The Air Navigation (Restriction of Flying) (Eastbourne) Regulations (SI 2011/844)
- The A14 Trunk Road (Junctions 8 to 6) (Kettering, Northamptonshire) (Temporary Prohibition of Traffic) Order (SI 2011/845)
- The M5 Motorway (Junction 18) (Temporary Prohibition of Traffic) Order (SI 2011/846)
- The A30 Trunk Road (Temple to Launceston, Cornwall) (Temporary Restriction of Traffic) Order (SI 2011/847)
- The A1(M) Motorway (Junction 37 to Junction 36) (Temporary Prohibition of Traffic) Order (SI 2011/848)
- The Social Care Charges (Wales) Measure 2010 (Commencement) Order (SI 2011/849)
- The M65 Motorway (Junctions 3–10, Eastbound and Westbound Carriageways and Slip Roads) (Temporary Prohibition and Restriction of Traffic) Order (SI 2011/850)
- The A303 Trunk Road (Countess Roundabout, Amesbury, Wiltshire) (40 mph Speed Limit) Order (SI 2011/851)
- The A585 Trunk Road (M55 Junction 3) (Temporary Prohibition and Restriction of Traffic) Order (SI 2011/852)
- The M6 Motorway (Junctions 38 – 37 Southbound Carriageway) (Temporary Restriction of Traffic) Order (SI 2011/853)
- The A66 Trunk Road (Snow Gates Upgrade, Brough) (Temporary Prohibition and Restriction of Traffic) Order (SI 2011/854)
- The M6 Motorway (Junctions 39 – 38, Southbound Carriageway) (Temporary Restriction of Traffic) Order (SI 2011/855)
- The M6 Motorway (Junctions 30–32, Northbound Carriageway, Link and Slip Roads) (Temporary Restriction and Prohibition of Traffic) Order (SI 2011/856)
- The Equality Act 2010 Codes of Practice (Services, Public Functions and Associations, Employment, and Equal Pay) Order (SI 2011/857)
- The M6 Motorway (Junctions 34–35, Northbound Carriageway) (Temporary Restriction of Traffic) Order (SI 2011/858)
- The A36 Trunk Road (Wilton Road, Salisbury, Wiltshire) (Restriction and Prohibition of Waiting) Order (SI 2011/859)
- The M4 Motorway (Junctions 2 – 5) (Temporary Prohibition of Traffic) Order (SI 2011/860)
- The A405 Trunk Road and the M25 Motorway (M25 Junction 21A – M1 Junction 6 and M25 Junction 23) (Temporary Prohibition of Traffic) Order (SI 2011/861)
- The A27 Trunk Road (West of Arundel) (Temporary Restriction and Prohibition of Traffic) Order (SI 2011/862)
- The M1 Motorway and the A414 Trunk Road (Junction 8 Hemel Hempstead, Hertfordshire) Connecting Roads (Temporary Prohibition of Traffic) Order (SI 2011/863)
- The A1 Trunk Road (Kenton Bar Interchange to Denton Burn Interchange) (Temporary Restriction and Prohibition of Traffic) (No.2) Order (SI 2011/864)
- The Flood and Coastal Erosion Risk Management Information Appeal (Wales) Regulations (SI 2011/865)
- The A1 Trunk Road (Leeming Bar to Catterick) (Temporary Restriction and Prohibition of Traffic) Order (SI 2011/866)
- The M62 Motorway (Junctions 18–19 Eastbound and Westbound Carriageways) (Temporary Prohibition and Restriction of Traffic) Order (SI 2011/867)
- The Workmen's Compensation (Supplementation) (Amendment) Scheme (SI 2011/868)
- The Social Security (Industrial Injuries) (Dependency) (Permitted Earnings Limits) Order (SI 2011/869)
- The A30 Trunk Road (M25 Junction 13, Link Road) (Temporary Prohibition of Traffic) Order (SI 2011/870)
- The A23 Trunk Road (Pease Pottage – Bolney) (Temporary Restriction and Prohibition of Traffic) Order (SI 2011/871)
- The A3 Trunk Road (Wisley Interchange, Southbound) (Temporary Prohibition of Traffic) Order (SI 2011/872)
- The A419 Trunk Road (White Hart Junction, Swindon) (Temporary Prohibition and Restriction of Traffic) Order (SI 2011/873)
- The M5 Motorway (Junctions 14–13) (Temporary Restriction of Traffic) Order (SI 2011/874)
- The M48 Motorway (Junction 1 to Moor Lane Overbridge) and M4 Motorway (Junction 22 to Moor Lane Overbridge) (Temporary Prohibition and Restriction of Traffic) Order (SI 2011/875)
- The M5 Motorway (Junctions 22 and 23 Slip Roads) (Temporary Prohibition of Traffic) Order (SI 2011/876)
- The M61 Motorway (Junctions 8–9 Northbound Carriageway) (Temporary Prohibition and Restriction of Traffic) Order (SI 2011/877)
- The M60 Motorway (Junction 27, Clockwise Entry Slip Road) (Temporary Prohibition of Traffic) Order (SI 2011/878)
- The M60 Motorway (Junctions 26-2 Clockwise and Anticlockwise Carriageways and Slip Roads) (Temporary Prohibition and Restriction of Traffic) Order (SI 2011/879)
- The Referendum on the Voting System (Welsh Forms) Order (SI 2011/880)
- The Animal By-Products (Enforcement) (England) Regulations (SI 2011/881)
- The Apprenticeships, Skills, Children and Learning Act 2009 (Commencement 2 and Transitional and Saving Provisions) Order 2010 (Amendment) Order (SI 2011/882)
- The Friendly Societies (Proxy Voting) Regulations (SI 2011/883)
- The Student Fees (Approved Plans) (Wales) Regulations (SI 2011/884)
- The Student Fees (Amounts) (Wales) Regulations (SI 2011/885)
- The Assembly Learning Grants and Loans (Higher Education) (Wales) ( 2) Regulations (SI 2011/886)
- The Egypt (Asset-Freezing) Regulations (SI 2011/887)
- The Tunisia (Asset-Freezing) Regulations (SI 2011/888)
- The British Waterways Board (Kennet and Avon Canal) (Reclassification) Order (SI 2011/889)
- The Eastern and Coastal Kent Community Health National Health Service Trust (Establishment) Amendment Order (SI 2011/890)
- The Hereford Hospitals National Health Service Trust (Establishment) Amendment Order (SI 2011/891)
- The Budget Responsibility and National Audit Act 2011 (Commencement No.1) Order (SI 2011/892)
- The A55 Trunk Road (Junction 11 (Llys y Gwynt Interchange), Bangor, Gwynedd to the Wales/England Border) and The A494/A550 Trunk Road (Ewloe Interchange, Flintshire) (Temporary Traffic Restriction & Prohibition) Order (SI 2011/893)
- The Landfill Tax (Amendment) Regulations (SI 2011/894)
- The Car Fuel Benefit Order (SI 2011/895)
- The Approved Mileage Allowance Payments (Rates) Regulations (SI 2011/896)
- The Value Added Tax (Increase of Registration Limits) Order (SI 2011/897)
- The Value Added Tax (Consideration for Fuel Provided for Private Use) Order (SI 2011/898)
- The Capital Gains Tax (Annual Exempt Amount) Order (SI 2011/899)
- The Apprenticeships (Issue of Apprenticeship Certificates) (England) Regulations (SI 2011/900)

== 901–1000 ==
- The Apprenticeships (Transitional Provision for Existing Vocational Specifications) (England) Order (SI 2011/901)
- The A5 Trunk Road and M6 Motorway (Junction 12, Gailey, Staffordshire) (Temporary Restriction and Prohibition of Traffic) Order (SI 2011/902)
- The A45 and A46 Trunk Roads (Coventry Eastern Bypass) (Temporary Restriction and Prohibition of Traffic) Order (SI 2011/903)
- The M50 and M5 Motorways (M50 Junction 2 to M5 Junction 8) (Temporary Restriction and Prohibition of Traffic) Order (SI 2011/904)
- The M5 Motorway (Junctions 4 to 5) and the M42 Motorway (Junction 1 to M5 Junction 4a) (Temporary Restriction and Prohibition of Traffic) Order (SI 2011/905)
- The M1 Motorway (Junction 20 – Junction 21) (Temporary Restriction and Prohibition of Traffic) Order (SI 2011/906)
- The Asylum Support (Amendment) Regulations (SI 2011/907)
- The Greater Manchester Combined Authority Order (SI 2011/908)
- The M1 Motorway (Junctions 25 to 28) (Variable Speed Limits) Regulations (SI 2011/909)
- The M1 Motorway and A38 Trunk Road (M1 Junction 28, Derbyshire) (Temporary Prohibition of Traffic) Order (SI 2011/910)
- The Air Navigation (Restriction of Flying) (Royal Air Force Cosford) Regulations (SI 2011/911)
- The M42 Motorway and A5 Trunk Road (M42 Junction 10, Dordon, Warwickshire) (Temporary Restriction and Prohibition of Traffic) Order (SI 2011/912)
- The M1 Motorway (Junctions 16 – 18, Northamptonshire) (Temporary Restriction and Prohibition of Traffic) Order (SI 2011/913)
- The A69 Trunk Road (Newcastle upon Tyne to Carlisle) (Temporary 50 Miles Per Hour, 40 Miles Per Hour and 10 Miles Per Hour Speed Restriction) Order (SI 2011/914)
- The Medicinal Products (Herbal Remedies) (Amendment) Regulations (SI 2011/915)
- The M4 Motorway (Junction 20, Almondsbury Interchange) (Temporary Prohibition of Traffic) Order (SI 2011/916)
- The Jobseeker's Allowance (Employment, Skills and Enterprise Scheme) Regulations 2011 (SI 2011/917)
- The M6 Motorway (Junction 6, Gravelly Hill) (Slip Roads) (Temporary Prohibition of Traffic) Order (SI 2011/918)
- The M5 Motorway (Junction 23 Northbound Exit Slip Road) (Temporary Prohibition of Traffic) Order (SI 2011/919)
- The A1 Trunk Road (South of Blyth, Nottinghamshire) (Temporary Prohibition of Traffic) Order (SI 2011/920)
- The A14 Trunk Road (Junctions 3 to 5) (Rothwell, Northamptonshire) (Temporary Prohibition of Traffic) Order (SI 2011/921)
- The A19 Trunk Road (Portrack Interchange to Stockton Ring Road Interchange) (Temporary Restriction and Prohibition of Traffic) Order (SI 2011/922)
- The Marine Licensing (Notices Appeals) (Wales) Regulations (SI 2011/923)
- The Marine Licensing (Civil Sanctions) (Wales) Order (SI 2011/924)
- The Marine Licensing (Appeals Against Licensing Decisions) (Wales) Regulations (SI 2011/925)
- The Local Authorities (Mayoral Elections) (England and Wales) (Amendment) Regulations (SI 2011/926)
- The M2 Motorway and the A2 Trunk Road (Junctions 1 – 4, Slip Roads) (Temporary Prohibition of Traffic) Order (SI 2011/927)
- The M20 Motorway and the A20 Trunk Road (Junctions 9 – 13, Slip Roads) (Temporary Prohibition of Traffic) Order (SI 2011/928)
- The M2 Motorway (Junctions 5 – 7, Slip Roads) (Temporary Prohibition of Traffic) Order (SI 2011/929)
- The M4 Motorway (Junctions 20 – 21) (Temporary Prohibition of Traffic) Order (SI 2011/930)
- The A46 Trunk Road (A439 Marraway Roundabout, Stratford-Upon-Avon, Warwickshire) (Derestriction) Order (SI 2011/931)
- The Immigration (Designation of Travel Bans) (Amendment No.3) Order (SI 2011/932)
- The A46 Trunk Road (Bishopton Roundabout, Stratford-Upon-Avon, Warwickshire) (50 Miles Per Hour Speed Limit) Order (SI 2011/933)
- The Marine Licensing (Licence Application Appeals) Regulations (SI 2011/934)
- The Road Traffic Exemptions (Special Forces) (Variation and Amendment) Regulations (SI 2011/935)
- The Marine Licensing (Notices Appeals) Regulations (SI 2011/936)
- The Education (School Performance Targets) (England) (Revocation) Regulations (SI 2011/937)
- The Social Security (Contributions) (Re-rating) Order (SI 2011/938)
- The Hull and Goole Port Health Authority Order (SI 2011/939)
- The Social Security (Contributions) (Amendment 2) Regulations (SI 2011/940)
- The M53 Motorway (Junction 7 Southbound and Northbound Carriageways) (Temporary Prohibition of Traffic) Order (SI 2011/941)
- The M60 Motorway (Junctions 19 – 23 Clockwise and Anticlockwise Carriageways and Slip Roads) (Temporary Prohibition and Restriction of Traffic) Order (SI 2011/942)
- The M5 Motorway (Junction 18 ‘V’ Loop Slip Road) (Temporary Prohibition of Traffic) Order (SI 2011/943)
- The A40 Trunk Road (M5 Junction 11 to Elmbridge Court Roundabout) (Temporary Prohibition of Traffic) Order (SI 2011/944)
- The A4 Trunk Road and A46 Trunk Road (London Road Junction, Bath) (Temporary Prohibition of Traffic) Order (SI 2011/945)
- The M4 Motorway (Junctions 16–17) (Temporary Restriction of Traffic) Order (SI 2011/946)
- The M61 Motorway (Southbound Entry Slip Road from the A666 Kearsley Roundabout) (Temporary Prohibition of Traffic) Order (SI 2011/947)
- The Council Tax (Discount Disregards) (Amendment) Order (SI 2011/948)
- The Children and Young Persons Act 2008 (Commencement 6) (Wales) Order (SI 2011/949)
- The Associated British Ports (Grimsby Riverside Ro-Ro Terminal) Harbour Revision Order (SI 2011/950)
- The Air Navigation (Restriction of Flying) (Windermere) Regulations (SI 2011/951)
- The M4 Motorway (Junction 22 Slip Roads) (Temporary Prohibition of Traffic) Order (SI 2011/952)
- The M54 Motorway and the A5 Trunk Road (Cluddley to Preston, Shropshire) (Temporary Prohibition of Traffic) Order (SI 2011/953)
- The M1 Motorway (Junctions 24 – 25) (Temporary Restriction and Prohibition of Traffic) Order (SI 2011/954)
- The M42 Motorway (Junction 5) (Slip Roads) (Temporary Prohibition of Traffic) Order (SI 2011/955)
- The M6 Toll Motorway (Junction T7 to Junction 11a) (Temporary Prohibition of Traffic) Order (SI 2011/956)
- The M5 and M42 Motorways (Junction 4a) (Temporary Prohibition of Traffic) Order (SI 2011/957)
- The M6 Motorway (Junction 1) (Slip Roads) (Temporary Prohibition of Traffic) Order (SI 2011/958)
- The M1 Motorway and the M62 Motorway (Lofthouse Interchange) (Temporary Prohibition of Traffic) Order (SI 2011/959)
- The M6 Motorway (Junction 36 Southbound Exit Slip Road) (Temporary Prohibition of Traffic) Order (SI 2011/960)
- The M5 Motorway (Junction 10 Slip Roads) (Temporary Prohibition of Traffic) Order (SI 2011/961)
- The Social Care Charges (Means Assessment and Determination of Charges) (Wales) Regulations (SI 2011/962)
- The Social Care Charges (Direct Payments) (Means Assessment and Determination of Reimbursement or Contribution) (Wales) Regulations (SI 2011/963)
- The Social Care Charges (Review of Charging Decisions) (Wales) Regulations (SI 2011/964)
- The Higher Education Funding Council for Wales (Supplementary Functions) Order (SI 2011/965)
- The Non-Domestic Rating (Collection and Enforcement) (Local Lists) (Amendment) (Wales) Regulations (SI 2011/966)
- The M25 Motorway and the A2 and the A282 Trunk Roads (Junction 2) (Temporary Prohibition of Traffic) Order (SI 2011/967)
- The Grants to the Churches Conservation Trust Order (SI 2011/968)
- The M5 Motorway (Junctions 21 & 22 Slip Roads) (Temporary Prohibition of Traffic) Order (SI 2011/969)
- The A404 Trunk Road and the A404(M) Motorway (Bisham Roundabout – M4 Junction 8/9) (Temporary Restriction and Prohibition of Traffic) Order 2009 Variation ( 2) Order (SI 2011/970)
- The Waste (Miscellaneous Provisions) (Wales) Regulations (SI 2011/971)
- The M4 Motorway (Junction 19 Westbound Entry Slip Road) (Temporary Prohibition of Traffic) Order (SI 2011/972)
- The M5 Motorway (Junctions 28 and 29 Slip Roads) (Temporary Prohibition and Restriction of Traffic) Order (SI 2011/973)
- The Merchant Shipping (Ship-to-Ship Transfers) (Amendment) Regulations (SI 2011/974)
- The Finance Act 2010, Schedule 10 (Appointed Days and Transitional Provisions) Order (SI 2011/975)
- The Penalties, Offshore Income etc. (Designation of Territories) Order (SI 2011/976)
- The Northern Ireland Arms Decommissioning Act 1997 (Cessation of Section 7) Order (SI 2011/977)
- The Northern Ireland (Monitoring Commission etc.) Act 2003 (Cessation of Provisions) Order (SI 2011/978)
- The M25 and the M26 Motorways (Junctions 4 and 5) (Temporary Prohibition of Traffic) Order (SI 2011/979)
- The Air Navigation (Restriction of Flying) (Kingston Lisle) Regulations (SI 2011/980)
- The Aquatic Animal Health (England and Wales) (Amendment) Regulations (SI 2011/981)
- The Offshore Chemicals (Amendment) Regulations (SI 2011/982)
- The Offshore Petroleum Activities (Oil Pollution Prevention and Control) (Amendment) Regulations (SI 2011/983)
- The Renewables Obligation (Amendment) Order (SI 2011/984)
- The Child Measurement Programme (Wales) Regulations (SI 2011/985)
- The Health and Social Care Act 2008 (Commencement No.17) Order (SI 2011/986)
- The Community Infrastructure Levy (Amendment) Regulations (SI 2011/987)
- The Waste (England and Wales) Regulations (SI 2011/988)
- The Flexible Working (Eligibility, Complaints and Remedies) (Amendment) (Revocation) Regulations (SI 2011/989)
- The Public Health Wales National Health Service Trust (Membership and Procedure) (Amendment) Regulations (SI 2011/990)
- The Beef and Veal Labelling (Wales) Regulations (SI 2011/991)
- The Child Trust Funds (Amendment 2) Regulations (SI 2011/992)
- The Tax Credits (Approval of Child Care Providers) (Wales) (Amendment) Scheme (SI 2011/993)
- The Vegetable Seed (Wales) (Amendment) Regulations (SI 2011/994)
- The Non-Domestic Rating (Small Business Relief) (Wales) (Amendment) Order (SI 2011/995)
- The Road Vehicles (Powers to Stop) Regulations (SI 2011/996)
- The M5 Motorway (Junctions 11A-12 Slip Roads) (Temporary Prohibition of Traffic) Order (SI 2011/997)
- The Air Navigation (Restriction of Flying) (Bournemouth Air Festival) Regulations (SI 2011/998)
- The M48 Motorway (Junction 1 Slip Roads) (Temporary Prohibition of Traffic) Order (SI 2011/999)
- The Social Security (Contributions) (Amendment 4) Regulations (SI 2011/1000)

== 1001–1100 ==
- The Social Security (Contributions) (Re-rating) Consequential Amendment Regulations (SI 2011/1001)
- The Housing and Regeneration Act 2008 (Commencement 8 and Transitional, Transitory and Saving Provisions) Order (SI 2011/1002)
- The Mobile Homes Act 1983 (Amendment of Schedule 1 and Consequential Amendments) (England) Order (SI 2011/1003)
- The Housing and Regeneration Act 2008 (Consequential Amendments to the Mobile Homes Act 1983) Order (SI 2011/1004)
- The Mobile Homes Act 1983 (Jurisdiction of Residential Property Tribunals) (England) Order (SI 2011/1005)
- The Mobile Homes (Written Statement) (England) Regulations (SI 2011/1006)
- The Residential Property Tribunal Procedures and Fees (England) Regulations (SI 2011/1007)
- The Domestic Violence, Crime and Victims Act 2004 (Commencement 14) Order (SI 2011/1008)
- The Reporting of Prices of Milk Products (Wales) Regulations (SI 2011/1009)
- The Visits to Children in Long-Term Residential Care Regulations (SI 2011/1010)
- The Government of Wales Act 2006 (Commencement of Assembly Act Provisions, Transitional and Saving Provisions and Modifications) Order (SI 2011/1011)
- The Water (Prevention of Pollution) (Code of Good Agricultural Practice) (Wales) Order (SI 2011/1012)
- The Scottish Parliament (Returning Officers’ Charges) Order (SI 2011/1013)
- The Recycling, Preparation for Re-use and Composting Targets (Monitoring and Penalties) (Wales) Regulations (SI 2011/1014)
- The M1 Motorway (Junctions 6A to 10) (Variable Speed Limits) Regulations (SI 2011/1015)
- The Care Homes (Wales) (Miscellaneous Amendments) Regulations (SI 2011/1016)
- The Landfill Tax (Qualifying Material) Order (SI 2011/1017)
- The A14 Trunk Road (Junction 49 Tothill Interchange, Stowmarket, Suffolk) (Temporary Restriction and Prohibition of Traffic) Order (SI 2011/1018)
- The A47 Trunk Road (A146 Trowse Interchange to West of Soke Road Bridge, Old Lakenham, Norwich, Norfolk) (Temporary Restriction and Prohibition of Traffic) Order (SI 2011/1019)
- The A12 Trunk Road (Yarmouth Road from Jubilee Way/A1144 St. Peter's Street Roundabout to Harris Avenue, Lowestoft, Suffolk) (Temporary Prohibition of Traffic) Order (SI 2011/1020)
- The M32 Motorway (Junctions 2 and 3 Slip Roads) (Temporary Prohibition of Traffic) Order (SI 2011/1021)
- The M5 Motorway (Junctions 18 & 18A Slip Roads) (Temporary Prohibition and Restriction of Traffic) Order (SI 2011/1022)
- The Climate Change Levy (Suspension of Recycling Exemption) Order (SI 2011/1023)
- The Mesothelioma Lump Sum Payments (Conditions and Amounts) (Amendment) Regulations (SI 2011/1024)
- The Climate Change Levy (Suspension of Transport Exemption) Order (SI 2011/1025)
- The Pneumoconiosis etc. (Workers’ Compensation) (Payment of Claims) (Amendment) Regulations (SI 2011/1026)
- The Community Legal Service (Funding) (Amendment) Order (SI 2011/1027)
- The M5 Motorway (Junctions 19 and 20 Slip Roads) (Temporary Prohibition of Traffic) Order (SI 2011/1028)
- The Guardian's Allowance Up-rating Order (SI 2011/1029)
- The Guardian's Allowance Up-rating (Northern Ireland) Order (SI 2011/1030)
- The M5 Motorway (Junction 15) and M4 Motorway (Junction 20) (Almondsbury Interchange Slip Roads) (Temporary Prohibition of Traffic) Order (SI 2011/1031)
- The M1 Motorway (Junction 45 to Junction 44) (Temporary Prohibition of Traffic) Order (SI 2011/1032)
- The Warm Home Discount Regulations (SI 2011/1033)
- The Data Protection (Subject Access Modification) (Social Work) (Amendment) Order (SI 2011/1034)
- The Tax Credits Up-rating Regulations (SI 2011/1035)
- The Social Security (Reduced Rates of Class 1 Contributions, Rebates and Minimum Contributions) Order (SI 2011/1036)
- The Enactment of Extra-Statutory Concessions Order (SI 2011/1037)
- The St Mary's College, Middlesbrough (Dissolution) Order (SI 2011/1038)
- The Guardian's Allowance Up-rating Regulations (SI 2011/1039)
- The Traffic Signs (Amendment) Regulations and General Directions (SI 2011/1040)
- The Freedom of Information (Additional Public Authorities) Order (SI 2011/1041)
- The Freedom of Information (Removal of References to Public Authorities) Order (SI 2011/1042)
- The Treaty of Lisbon (Changes in Terminology) Order (SI 2011/1043)
- The Access to Justice Act 1999 (Destination of Appeals) (Family Proceedings) Order (SI 2011/1044)
- The Family Procedure (Modification of Enactments) Order (SI 2011/1045)
- The A417 and A419 Trunk Roads (Cirencester) (Temporary Prohibition of Traffic) Order (SI 2011/1046)
- The A50 Trunk Road (Doveridge to Blythe Bridge) (Temporary Restriction and Prohibition of Traffic) Order (SI 2011/1047)
- The Air Navigation (Restriction of Flying) (Kingston Lisle) (Revocation) Regulations (SI 2011/1048)
- The A5 Trunk Road (Near Kilsby, Northamptonshire) (Derestriction) Order (SI 2011/1049)
- The A38 Trunk Road (Bickington to Chudleigh, Near Newton Abbot) (Temporary Prohibition and Restriction of Traffic) Order (SI 2011/1050)
- The A5 Trunk Road (Gailey, Staffordshire) (Temporary Prohibition of Traffic) Order (SI 2011/1051)
- The M5 Motorway (Junctions 9 to 8) (Temporary Prohibition of Traffic) Order (SI 2011/1052)
- The M6 Motorway (Junction 6, Gravelly Hill) (Slip Roads) (Temporary Prohibition of Traffic) ( 2) Order (SI 2011/1053)
- The Income Tax (Pay As You Earn) (Amendment) (No.2) Regulations (SI 2011/1054)
- The Immigration and Nationality (Fees) Regulations (SI 2011/1055)
- The A1 Trunk Road (Dunston Interchange) (Temporary Restriction of Traffic) Order (SI 2011/1056)
- The Air Navigation (Restriction of Flying) (Stonehenge) Regulations (SI 2011/1057)
- The M5 Motorway (Junction 25 Northbound Entry Slip Road) (Temporary Prohibition of Traffic) Order (SI 2011/1058)
- The Air Navigation (Restriction of Flying) (Sunderland) Regulations (SI 2011/1059)
- The Equality Act 2010 (Public Authorities and Consequential and Supplementary Amendments) Order (SI 2011/1060)
- The A1 Trunk Road (Dunston Interchange) (Temporary Prohibition of Traffic) Order (SI 2011/1061)
- The A47 Trunk Road (Terrington St John to Tilney All Saints, King's Lynn, Norfolk) (Temporary Restriction and Prohibition of Traffic) Order (SI 2011/1062)
- The Equality Act 2010 (Specification of Relevant Welsh Authorities) Order (SI 2011/1063)
- The Equality Act 2010 (Statutory Duties) (Wales) Regulations (SI 2011/1064)
- The Timeshare (Amendment) Regulations (SI 2011/1065)
- The Equality Act 2010 (Commencement 6) Order (SI 2011/1066)
- The A1(M) Motorway (Junctions 2 – 4) (Temporary Restriction and Prohibition of Traffic) Order 2009 Variation Order (SI 2011/1067)
- The Air Navigation (Restriction of Flying) (Southport) Regulations (SI 2011/1068)
- The Employment Equality (Repeal of Retirement Age Provisions) Regulations (SI 2011/1069)
- The A11 Trunk Road (Fiveways to Thetford Improvement) (Detrunking) Order (SI 2011/1070)
- The Value Added Tax (Input Tax) (Amendment) Order (SI 2011/1071)
- The Network Rail (Hitchin (Cambridge Junction)) Order 2011 (SI 2011/1072)
- The Licensing Act 2003 (Royal Wedding Licensing Hours) Order (SI 2011/1073)
- The A11 Trunk Road (Fiveways to Thetford Improvement and Slip Roads) Order (SI 2011/1074)
- The International Tax Enforcement (Antigua and Barbuda) Order (SI 2011/1075)
- The International Tax Enforcement (Saint Lucia) Order (SI 2011/1076)
- The International Tax Enforcement (Saint Christopher (Saint Kitts) and Nevis) Order (SI 2011/1077)
- The International Tax Enforcement (Saint Vincent and the Grenadines) Order (SI 2011/1078)
- The International Mutual Administrative Assistance in Tax Matters Order (SI 2011/1079)
- The Libya (Restrictive Measures) (Overseas Territories) Order (SI 2011/1080)
- The Child Abduction and Custody (Parties to Conventions) (Amendment) ( 2) Order (SI 2011/1081)
- The Terrorist Asset-Freezing etc. Act 2010 (Guernsey) Order (SI 2011/1082)
- The Double Taxation Relief and International Tax Enforcement (Montserrat) Order (SI 2011/1083)
- The Solihull Primary Care Trust (Establishment) Amendment Order (SI 2011/1084)
- The Stamp Duty and Stamp Duty Reserve Tax (SIX Swiss Exchange AG)(Recognised Foreign Exchange) Regulations (SI 2011/1085)
- The Ivory Coast (Asset-Freezing) Regulations (SI 2011/1086)
- The Air Navigation (Restriction of Flying) (Shoreham-by-Sea) Regulations (SI 2011/1087)
- The M27 Motorway (Junction 1, Westbound Exit Slip Road) (Temporary Prohibition of Traffic) Order (SI 2011/1088)
- The M3 Motorway and the M27 Motorway (Chilworth Interchange – M3 Junction 14, Northbound) (Temporary Prohibition of Traffic) Order (SI 2011/1089)
- The A63 Trunk Road (Market Place to Garrison Road Roundabout) (Temporary Prohibition of Traffic and Pedestrians) Order (SI 2011/1090)
- The A303 Trunk Road (Hayes End Roundabout, Near South Petherton) (Temporary Prohibition of Traffic) Order (SI 2011/1091)
- The M5 Motorway (Junction 21 Northbound Entry Slip Road) (Temporary Prohibition of Traffic) Order (SI 2011/1092)
- The A5 Trunk Road (Tamworth, Staffordshire) (Link Road) (Temporary 30 Miles Per Hour Speed Limit) Order (SI 2011/1093)
- The Democratic People's Republic of Korea (Asset-Freezing) Regulations (SI 2011/1094)
- The M6 Motorway (Junction 2 to Junction 1, Warwickshire) (Temporary Prohibition of Traffic) Order (SI 2011/1095)
- The A38 Trunk Road (Hilliards Cross to Clay Mills, Staffordshire) (Slip Roads) (Temporary Prohibition of Traffic) Order (SI 2011/1096)
- The M50 Motorway (M5 Junction 8 – M50 Junction 2) (Temporary Prohibition of Traffic) Order (SI 2011/1097)
- The A500 Trunk Road (Stoke-on-Trent, Staffordshire) (Temporary Prohibition of Traffic) Order (SI 2011/1098)
- The Referendum on the Voting System (Counting Officers’ and Regional Counting Officers’ Charges) Order (SI 2011/1099)
- The Children, Schools and Families Act 2010 (Commencement No.2) Order (SI 2011/1100)

== 1101–1200 ==
- The A500 Trunk Road (Stoke-on-Trent, Staffordshire) (Temporary Prohibition of Traffic) (No.2) Order (SI 2011/1101)
- The M5 Motoerway (Junction 27 Northbound Exit Slip Road)(Temporary Prohibition of Traffic) Order (SI 2011/1102)
- The Air Navigation (Restriction of Flying) (Jet Formation Display Teams) ( 2) Regulations (SI 2011/1103)
- The Air Navigation (Restriction of Flying) (Her Majesty The Queen?s Birthday Flypast) Regulations (SI 2011/1104)
- The Air Navigation (Restriction of Flying) (RNAS Yeovilton) Regulations (SI 2011/1105)
- The A5 Trunk Road (Eastern Way, Heath and Reach, Bedfordshire) (De-restriction) Order (SI 2011/1106)
- The A63 Trunk Road (Melton Interchange) (Temporary Prohibition of Traffic) Order (SI 2011/1107)
- The Irish Sailors and Soldiers Land Trust Act 1987 (Dissolution) Order (SI 2011/1108)
- The A282 and A2 Trunk Roads and the M25 Motorway (Junctions 1A – 2 and Dartford Heath) (Temporary Prohibition of Traffic) Order (SI 2011/1109)
- The A31 Trunk Road (Verwood Interchange, Eastbound Entry Slip Road) (Temporary Prohibition of Traffic) Order (SI 2011/1110)
- The M23 Motorway (Junctions 10 – 10A, Carriageways) (Temporary Restriction of Traffic) Order (SI 2011/1111)
- The A405 Trunk Road (M1 Junction 6) (Temporary Prohibition of Traffic) Order (SI 2011/1112)
- The A27 Trunk Road and the A3(M) Motorway (Junction 5) (Temporary Prohibition of Traffic) Order (SI 2011/1113)
- The M20 Motorway (Junctions 9 – 10) (Temporary Restriction and Prohibition of Traffic) Order (SI 2011/1114)
- The M1 Motorway (Junction 35A, Stocksbridge) (Temporary Prohibition of Traffic) Order (SI 2011/1115)
- The Veterinary Medicines (Amendment) Regulations (SI 2011/1116)
- The Legal Services Act 2007 (Approved Regulators) Order (SI 2011/1118)
- The Road Safety Act 2006 (Commencement 7) Order (SI 2011/1119)
- The Motor Vehicles (Insurance Requirements) (Immobilisation, Removal and Disposal) Regulations (SI 2011/1120)
- The Mandatory Travel Concession (England) Regulations (SI 2011/1121)
- The Coroners and Justice Act 2009 (Commencement 6) Order (SI 2011/1122)
- The A38 Trunk Road (Kennford, Devon) (Temporary Prohibition and Restriction of Traffic) Order (SI 2011/1123)
- The M61 Motorway (Junctions 3-1 Southbound Carriageway, Link and Entry Slip Roads) and Kearsley Spur (Temporary Prohibition of Traffic) Order (SI 2011/1124)
- The M6 Motorway (Junctions 6 to 7) (Temporary Prohibition of Traffic) Order (SI 2011/1125)
- The A40 Trunk Road (Huntley Hill, Gloucestershire) (Temporary Restriction of Traffic) Order (SI 2011/1126)
- The Export Control (Amendment) ( 3) Order (SI 2011/1127)
- The Wireless Telegraphy (Licence Charges) Regulations (SI 2011/1128)
- The Iran (Asset-Freezing) Regulations (SI 2011/1129)
- The Sunbeds (Regulation) Act 2010 (Wales) Regulations (SI 2011/1130)
- The A19 Trunk Road (Parkway Interchange to Crathorne Interchange) (Temporary Prohibition of Traffic) Order (SI 2011/1131)
- The M6 Motorway (Junctions 44-43 Southbound Carriageway and Junction 44 Southbound Entry Slip Road) (Temporary Prohibition and Restriction of Traffic) Order (SI 2011/1132)
- The Cross-Border Mediation (EU Directive) Regulations (SI 2011/1133)
- The A13, the A1089 and the A282 Trunk Roads and the M25 Motorway (M25 Junction 30 Tilbury Docks) (Temporary Restriction and Prohibition of Traffic) Order (SI 2011/1134)
- The Fruit Juices and Fruit Nectars (England) (Amendment) Regulations (SI 2011/1135)
- The M20 Motorway (Junction 9) (Temporary Prohibition of Traffic) Order (SI 2011/1136)
- The Air Navigation (Restriction of Flying) (Wales National Airshow) Regulations (SI 2011/1137)
- The A1 Trunk Road and the A1(M) Motorway (A1(M) Junction 1 Rowley Lane, Southbound) (Temporary Prohibition of Traffic) Order (SI 2011/1138)
- The M180 Motorway (Junction 2 to North Ings Interchange) (Temporary Restriction and Prohibition of Traffic) Order (SI 2011/1139)
- The Air Navigation (Restriction of Flying) (Royal International Air Tattoo RAF Fairford) Regulations (SI 2011/1140)
- The M6 Motorway (Junction 6, Gravelly Hill) (Slip Roads) (Temporary Prohibition of Traffic) ( 3) Order (SI 2011/1141)
- The Thetford Range Byelaws (SI 2011/1142)
- The A47 Trunk Road (Necton Swaffham and Pentney King's Lynn, Norfolk) (Temporary Restriction and Prohibition of Traffic) Order (SI 2011/1143)
- The M5 Motorway (Junction 4a, Worcestershire) (Link Road) (Temporary Prohibition of Traffic) Order (SI 2011/1144)
- The A46 and A52 Trunk Roads (Widmerpool to Newark-on-Trent) (Temporary Restriction and Prohibition of Traffic) Order (SI 2011/1145)
- The A1 Trunk Road (Dunston Interchange) (Width Restriction) Order (SI 2011/1146)
- The Designation of Schools Having a Religious Character (Independent Schools) (England) ( 2) Order (SI 2011/1147)
- The M6 Motorway (Junctions 39–40 Northbound Carriageway) (Temporary Restriction of Traffic) Order (SI 2011/1148)
- The Academies Act 2010 (Commencement 2) Order (SI 2011/1149)
- The Electricity (Individual Generation Exemptions) Order (SI 2011/1150)
- The A590 Trunk Road (Barr End Rockface, Greenodd) (Temporary Prohibition and Restriction of Traffic) Order (SI 2011/1151)
- The M61 Motorway (Junction 3 Kearsley Spur Northbound Carriageway)(Temporary Prohibition of Traffic) Order (SI 2011/1152)
- The M621 Motorway (Junction 1 to Junction 7) (Temporary Prohibition of Traffic) Order (SI 2011/1153)
- The A174 Trunk Road (Stokesley Road Interchange to Greystones Roundabout) and the A1053 Trunk Road (Greystones Road) (Temporary Restriction and Prohibition of Traffic) Order (SI 2011/1154)
- The M1 Motorway (Junctions 1 — 4) (Temporary Restriction and Prohibition of Traffic) Order (SI 2011/1155)
- The A27 Trunk Road (Falmer House Road) (No Entry) Order (SI 2011/1156)
- The Skipton Fund Limited (Application of Sections 731, 733 and 734 of the Income Tax (Trading and Other Income) Act 2005) Order (SI 2011/1157)
- The Asylum and Immigration (Treatment of Claimants, etc.) Act 2004 (Remedial) Order (SI 2011/1158)
- The Equality Act 2010 (Guidance on the Definition of Disability) Appointed Day Order (SI 2011/1159)
- The M4 Motorway (Junction 7, Slip Roads) (Temporary Prohibition of Traffic) Order (SI 2011/1160)
- The M3 Motorway (Junctions 9 — 8) (Temporary Prohibition of Traffic) Order (SI 2011/1161)
- The A1 Trunk Road (Footway Closure, Sandy Roundabout, Bedfordshire) (Temporary Prohibition of Pedestrians) Order (SI 2011/1162)
- The A12 Trunk Road (Bentley Interchange to Copdock Mill Interchange) and the A14 Trunk Road (Sproughton Interchange to Wherstead Interchange) (Ipswich, Suffolk) (Temporary Restriction and Prohibition of Traffic) Order (SI 2011/1163)
- The A1 Trunk Road (A6001/B658 Biggleswade North Roundabout to London Road/Biggleswade South Roundabout, Bedfordshire) Southbound (Temporary Prohibition of Traffic) Order (SI 2011/1164)
- The A12 Trunk Road (Junction 13 B1002 Trueloves Lane Interchange, Margaretting, Ingatestone to West of Junction 16 B1007 Stock Road Interchange, Galleywood, Chelmsford, Essex)(Temporary Restriction and Prohibition of Traffic) Order (SI 2011/1165)
- The A14 Trunk Road (Trimley Interchange to Dock Gate 1 Roundabout, Felixstowe, Suffolk) (Temporary Restriction and Prohibition of Traffic) Order (SI 2011/1166)
- The Insolvency Proceedings (Fees) (Amendment) Order (SI 2011/1167)
- The Local Justice Areas Order (SI 2011/1168)
- The Multiplex Licence (Broadcasting of Programmes in Gaelic) (Revocation) Order (SI 2011/1169)
- The Digital Economy Act 2010 (Appointed Day 1) Order (SI 2011/1170)
- The Civil Partnership (Registration Provisions) (Amendment) Regulations (SI 2011/1171)
- The Registration of Marriages (Amendment) Regulations (SI 2011/1172)
- The M621 Motorway (Gildersome Interchange) (Temporary Prohibition of Traffic) Order (SI 2011/1173)
- The A180 Trunk Road (Great Coates Interchange to Pyewipe Roundabout) (Temporary Prohibition of Traffic) Order (SI 2011/1174)
- The M27 Motorway (Junctions 11 and 12, Slip/Link Roads) (Temporary Prohibition of Traffic) Order (SI 2011/1175)
- The A30 Trunk Road (Innis Downs to Callywith, Bodmin) (Temporary Prohibition and Restriction of Traffic) Order (SI 2011/1176)
- The A55 Trunk Road (Llanfairpwll to Engedi, Isle of Anglesey) (Temporary Traffic Restrictions and Prohibitions) Order (SI 2011/1177)
- The Climate Change Levy (Suspension of Transport Exemption) (Revocation) Order (SI 2011/1178)
- The A1 Trunk Road (Lobley Hill Interchange) (Temporary Prohibition of Traffic) Order (SI 2011/1179)
- The A1 Trunk Road (Dunston Interchange and Swalwell Interchange) (Temporary Prohibition of Traffic) Order (SI 2011/1180)
- The Feed-in Tariffs (Specified Maximum Capacity and Functions) (Amendment) Order (SI 2011/1181)
- The National Health Service (Primary Dental Services) (Miscellaneous Amendments) Regulations (SI 2011/1182)
- The Northampton General Hospital National Health Service Trust (Establishment) Amendment Order (SI 2011/1183)
- The Whittington Hospital National Health Service Trust (Establishment) Amendment Order (SI 2011/1184)
- The East Sussex Hospitals National Health Service Trust (Establishment) and the Eastbourne Hospitals National Health Service Trust and Hastings and Rother National Health Service Trust (Dissolution) Amendment Order (SI 2011/1185)
- The Sports Grounds and Sporting Events (Designation) (Amendment) Order (SI 2011/1186)
- The Football (Offences) (Designation of Football Matches) (Amendment) Order (SI 2011/1187)
- The A69 Trunk Road (Horsley Junction) (Temporary Restriction and Prohibition of Traffic) Order (SI 2011/1188)
- The A5036 Trunk Road (Temporary Restriction of Traffic) (No 2) Order (SI 2011/1189)
- The Education (Nutritional Standards and Requirements for School Food) (England) (Amendment) Regulations (SI 2011/1190)
- The Legal Services Commission (Number of Commissioners) Order (SI 2011/1191)
- The A5 Trunk Road (Little Brickhill, Milton Keynes to Hockliffe, Bedfordshire) (Temporary Prohibition of Traffic) Order (SI 2011/1192)
- The A11 Trunk Road (A1066 Mundford Road Roundabout to A134 Brandon Road Roundabout, Thetford, Norfolk) (Temporary Prohibition of Traffic) Order (SI 2011/1193)
- The Poultry Health Scheme (Fees) Regulations (SI 2011/1194)
- The A12 Trunk Road (Bascule Bridge, Lowestoft, Suffolk) (Temporary Prohibition of Traffic and Pedestrians) Order (SI 2011/1195)
- The A13 Trunk Road (A126 Lakeside Junction, Northbound Carriageway) (Temporary Prohibition of Traffic) Order (SI 2011/1196)
- The Trade in Animals and Related Products Regulations (SI 2011/1197)
- The A23 Trunk Road (Hickstead Interchange Pyecombe Interchange) (Temporary Prohibition of Traffic) Order (SI 2011/1198)
- The M27 Motorway and the M3 Motorway (M27 Junction 4/M3 Junction 14) (Temporary Prohibition of Traffic) Order (SI 2011/1199)
- The M27 Motorway (Junctions 5 – 7) (Temporary Prohibition of Traffic) Order (SI 2011/1200)

== 1201–1300 ==
- The A27 Trunk Road (Fontwell — Arundel, Eastbound) (Temporary Restriction and Prohibition of Traffic) Order (SI 2011/1201)
- The M25 Motorway and the A1(M) Motorway (M25 Junction 23) (Temporary Prohibition of Traffic) Order (SI 2011/1202)
- The A20 Trunk Road (West of Courtwood Interchange) (Temporary Prohibition of Traffic) Order (SI 2011/1203)
- The M25 Motorway (Junctions 25 – 26) (Temporary Restriction and Prohibition of Traffic) Order (SI 2011/1204)
- The M181 Motorway (Midmoor Interchange to Frodingham Grange Roundabout) and the M180 Motorway (Temporary Prohibition of Traffic) Order (SI 2011/1205)
- The M4 Motorway (Slip Roads between Junction 38 (Margam) and Junction 43 (Llandarcy)) (Temporary Prohibition of Vehicles) Order (SI 2011/1206)
- The M62 Motorway (Junction 30, Rothwell) (Temporary Prohibition of Traffic) Order (SI 2011/1207)
- The Privacy and Electronic Communications (EC Directive) (Amendment) Regulations (SI 2011/1208)
- The Electronic Communications (Universal Service) (Amendment) Order (SI 2011/1209)
- The Electronic Communications and Wireless Telegraphy Regulations (SI 2011/1210)
- The Offshore Funds (Tax) (Amendment) Regulations (SI 2011/1211)
- The Public Health (Aircraft and Ships) (Isle of Man) (Amendment) Order (SI 2011/1212)
- The Transfer of Functions (Museum and Other Staff) Order (SI 2011/1213)
- The M18 Motorway (Junction 4 to Junction 5) (Temporary Restriction and Prohibition of Traffic) Order (SI 2011/1214)
- The Civil Jurisdiction and Judgments (Maintenance) (Rules of Court) Regulations (SI 2011/1215)
- The A19 Trunk Road (Seaton Burn to Moor Farm) (Temporary Prohibition of Traffic) Order (SI 2011/1216)
- The Air Navigation (Restriction of Flying) (Cholmondeley Castle) Regulations (SI 2011/1217)
- The M6 Motorway (Junction 9) (Northbound Exit Slip Road) (Temporary Prohibition of Traffic) Order (SI 2011/1218)
- The M6 Motorway (Junction 16) (Southbound Entry Slip Road) (Temporary Prohibition of Traffic) Order (SI 2011/1219)
- The M6 Motorway (Junction 1) (Northbound Entry Slip Road) (Temporary Prohibition of Traffic) Order (SI 2011/1220)
- The A50 Trunk Road (Uttoxeter to East of Foston) (Temporary Restriction and Prohibition of Traffic) Order (SI 2011/1221)
- The Air Navigation (Restriction of Flying) (Royal Air Force Waddington) Regulations (SI 2011/1222)
- The Civil Contingencies Act 2004 (Amendment of List of Responders) Order (SI 2011/1223)
- The Crime and Disorder Act 1998 (Responsible Authorities) Order (SI 2011/1224)
- The A4076 Trunk Road (Pope Hill, Johnston, Pembrokeshire) (Temporary Traffic Restrictions and Prohibition) Order (SI 2011/1225)
- The A303 Trunk Road (Southfields Roundabout, Ilminster) (Temporary Prohibition and Restriction of Traffic) (Number 2) Order (SI 2011/1226)
- The A5 Trunk Road (Friars Wash Roundabout to Hollybush Lane, Flamstead, Hertfordshire) (Temporary Restriction and Prohibition of Traffic) Order (SI 2011/1227)
- The A14 Trunk Road (Junction 44 Moreton Hall Interchange Bury St. Edmunds to Junction 46 Thurston Road Beyton, Suffolk) (Temporary Restriction and Prohibition of Traffic) Order (SI 2011/1228)
- The A494 Trunk Road (East of Tan yr Unto Bends, Denbighshire) (Temporary Traffic Restrictions and Prohibitions) Order (SI 2011/1229)
- The Crime and Disorder (Formulation and Implementation of Strategy) (Amendment) Regulations (SI 2011/1230)
- The A12 Trunk Road (Junction 21 Witham South Interchange to Junction 23 Kelvedon South, Essex) Northbound (Temporary Restriction and Prohibition of Traffic) Order (SI 2011/1231)
- The A43 Trunk Road and M40 Motorway (Junction 10, Ardley, Oxfordshire) (Temporary Restriction and Prohibition of Traffic) Order (SI 2011/1232)
- The A50 Trunk Road (Derby Southern Bypass) (Derby Services)(Eastbound Exit Slip Road) (Temporary Prohibition of Traffic) Order (SI 2011/1233)
- The A38 and A5148 Trunk Roads (A38 Weeford to Swinfen, Staffordshire) (Temporary Prohibition of Traffic) Order (SI 2011/1234)
- The M5 Motorway (Junction 1 M6 Junction 8) (Temporary Restriction and Prohibition of Traffic) Order (SI 2011/1235)
- The A1033 Trunk Road (Marfleet) (Temporary Prohibition of Traffic) Order (SI 2011/1236)
- The A64 Trunk Road (Various Locations) (Temporary Restriction and Prohibition of Traffic) Order (SI 2011/1237)
- The A69 Trunk Road (West Denton Interchange to Denton Burn Interchange) (Temporary Prohibition of Traffic) Order (SI 2011/1238)
- The Pensions Appeal Tribunals Act 1943 (Time Limit for Appeals) (Amendment) Regulations (SI 2011/1239)
- The Pensions Appeal Tribunals Act 1943 (Armed Forces and Reserve Forces Compensation Scheme) (Rights of Appeal) Regulations (SI 2011/1240)
- The M1 Motorway (Junction 28, Derbyshire) (Temporary Restriction and Prohibition of Traffic) Order (SI 2011/1241)
- The Constitutional Reform Act 2005 (Consequential Amendments) Order (SI 2011/1242)
- The A52 Trunk Road (M1 Junction 25 to Nottingham Knight Roundabout, Nottingham) (Temporary Prohibition of Traffic) Order (SI 2011/1243)
- The Syria (Asset-Freezing) Regulations (SI 2011/1244)
- The Pensions Act 2007 (Abolition of Contracting-out for Defined Contribution Pension Schemes) (Consequential Amendments) Regulations (SI 2011/1245)
- The Pensions Act 2008 (Abolition of Protected Rights) (Consequential Amendments) Order (SI 2011/1246)
- The Immigration (European Economic Area) (Amendment) Regulations (SI 2011/1247)
- The General Medical Council (Applications for General Practice and Specialist Registration) (Amendment) Regulations Order of Council (SI 2011/1248)
- The M20 Motorway (Junction 11A, Londonbound Entry Slip Road) (Temporary Prohibition of Traffic) Order (SI 2011/1249)
- The M25 Motorway (Junction 18, Anti-Clockwise Entry Slip Road) (Temporary Prohibition of Traffic) Order (SI 2011/1250)
- The M25 and M20 Motorways and the A20 Trunk Road (Swanley Interchange) (Temporary Prohibition of Traffic) Order (SI 2011/1251)
- The A1(M) Motorway (Hatfield Tunnel) (Temporary Prohibition of Traffic) Order (SI 2011/1252)
- The M11 Motorway (Junction 4, Southbound Link Road) (Temporary Restriction and Prohibition of Traffic) Order (SI 2011/1253)
- The A46 Trunk Road (Binley, Coventry) (Temporary Restriction of Traffic) Order (SI 2011/1254)
- The Health Act 2009 (Commencement No.3) (Amendment) Order (SI 2011/1255)
- The Tobacco Advertising and Promotion (Display and Specialist Tobacconists) (England) (Amendment) Regulations (SI 2011/1256)
- The M42 Motorway (Junction 6) (Southbound Exit Slip Road) (Temporary Prohibition of Traffic) Order (SI 2011/1257)
- The M6 Motorway (Junction 2, Warwickshire) (Temporary Prohibition of Traffic) Order (SI 2011/1258)
- The A453 Trunk Road (Nottingham) (Temporary Prohibition of Traffic) Order (SI 2011/1259)
- The Immigration (Designation of Travel Bans) (Amendment No.4) Order (SI 2011/1260)
- The Air Navigation (Restriction of Flying) (Visit by The President of the United States of America) Regulations (SI 2011/1261)
- The M6 Toll Motorway (Junction T2 to M6 Junction 3a) and the M42 Motorway (Junction 9 to Junction 8) (Temporary Prohibition of Traffic Order (SI 2011/1262)
- The M5 Motorway (Junction 5 to Junction 6, Worcestershire) (Temporary Prohibition of Traffic) Order (SI 2011/1263)
- The M5 Motorway (Junction 8, Strensham) (Temporary Prohibition of Traffic) Order (SI 2011/1264)
- The Companies Act 2006 (Consequential Amendments and Transitional Provisions) Order (SI 2011/1265)
- The Pensions Act 2008 (Commencement 10) Order (SI 2011/1266)
- The Pensions Act 2007 (Commencement 4) Order (SI 2011/1267)
- The Whole of Government Accounts (Designation of Bodies) Order (SI 2011/1268)
- The M62 Motorway (Junction 22 and Junction 24) (Temporary Prohibition of Traffic) Order (SI 2011/1269)
- The A64 Trunk Road (Askham Bryan) (Temporary Prohibition of Traffic) Order (SI 2011/1270)
- The Courts Act 2003 (Continuing Provision of Court-houses) (Amendment) Regulations (SI 2011/1271)
- The A419 Trunk Road (South Cerney to Cricklade) (Temporary Prohibition of Traffic) Order (SI 2011/1272)
- The A66 Trunk Road (Kemplay Bank Roundabout Improvement Scheme) (Temporary Prohibition and Restriction of Traffic) Order (SI 2011/1273)
- The Constitutional Reform and Governance Act 2010 (Commencement 5) Order (SI 2011/1274)
- The Financial Transparency (EC Directive) (Amendment) Regulations (SI 2011/1275)
- The Ashton, Leigh and Wigan Community Healthcare National Health Service Trust (Establishment) Amendment Order (SI 2011/1276)
- The A249 Trunk Road (Bobbing Junction – Stockbury Roundabout) (Temporary Prohibition of Traffic) Order (SI 2011/1277)
- The A34 Trunk Road (Tot Hill Interchange West Ilsley Interchange) (Temporary Restriction of Traffic) Order (SI 2011/1278)
- The Tractor etc. (EC Type-Approval) (Amendment) Regulations (SI 2011/1279)
- The M20 Motorway (Junctions 8 — 7, Londonbound) (Temporary Restriction and Prohibition of Traffic) Order (SI 2011/1280)
- The M25 Motorway (Junctions 7 8) (Temporary Restriction and Prohibition of Traffic) Order (SI 2011/1281)
- The M3 Motorway (Junctions 13 and 14, Slip/Link Roads) (Temporary Prohibition of Traffic) Order (SI 2011/1282)
- The M6 Motorway Junction 21A (Northbound and Southbound Link Roads to the M62 Eastbound) (Temporary Prohibition of Traffic) Order (SI 2011/1283)
- The M4 Motorway (Junctions 1 — 4B) (Temporary Prohibition of Traffic) Order (SI 2011/1284)
- The A30 Trunk Road (Launceston) (Temporary Prohibition and Restriction of Traffic) Order (SI 2011/1285)
- The M42 Motorway (Junction 10, Warwickshire) (Temporary 50 Miles Per Hour Speed Restriction) Order (SI 2011/1286)
- The A5 Trunk Road (Grendon, Warwickshire) (Temporary Prohibition of Traffic) Order (SI 2011/1287)
- The M50 Motorway (M5 Junction 8 to M50 Junction 4) (Temporary Restriction and Prohibition of Traffic) Order (SI 2011/1288)
- The M6 Motorway (Junction 7) (Southbound Exit Slip Road) (Temporary Prohibition of Traffic) Order (SI 2011/1289)
- The Air Navigation (Restriction of Flying) (Visit by The President of the United States of America) (Amendment) Regulations (SI 2011/1290)
- The A38 Trunk Road (Willington) (Temporary Prohibition of Traffic) Order (SI 2011/1291)
- The Air Navigation (Restriction of Flying) (Dunsfold) Regulations (SI 2011/1292)
- The UK Borders Act 2007 (Commencement 7 and Transitional Provisions) Order (SI 2011/1293)
- The Occupational Pension Schemes (Contracting-out) Amendment Regulations (SI 2011/1294)
- The Taxation of Chargeable Gains (Gilt-edged Securities) Order (SI 2011/1295)
- The Export Control (Eritrea and Miscellaneous Amendments) Order (SI 2011/1296)
- The Export Control (Iran) Order (SI 2011/1297)
- The A11 Trunk Road (B1135 Browick Road Interchange to B1135/B1172 Tuttles Lane Interchange, Wymondham, Norfolk) (Temporary Restriction and Prohibition of Traffic)Order (SI 2011/1298)
- The M42 Motorway (Junctions 1 to 3a) (Temporary Restriction and Prohibition of Traffic) Order (SI 2011/1299)
- The M42 Motorway (Junction 9, Near Curdworth, Warwickshire) (Temporary Prohibition of Traffic) Order (SI 2011/1300)

== 1301–1400 ==
- The Investment Bank Special Administration (England and Wales) Rules (SI 2011/1301)
- The M1 Motorway (Junction 34, Tinsley Viaduct) (Temporary Prohibition of Traffic) Order (SI 2011/1302)
- The A3 Trunk Road (Hindhead – Liphook) (Temporary Restriction and Prohibition of Traffic) Order (SI 2011/1303)
- The Export Control (Syria and Miscellaneous Amendments) Order (SI 2011/1304)
- The M1 and the A1(M) Motorways (M1 Junctions 2, 3, 5, 6 and 6A/A1(M) Junctions 3 and 4) (Temporary Prohibition of Traffic) Order (SI 2011/1305)
- The FIRST Option Bonds (Exchange of Securities) Rules (SI 2011/1306)
- The Disabled Persons (Badges for Motor Vehicles) (England) (Amendment) Regulations (SI 2011/1307)
- The A40 Trunk Road (Gibraltar Tunnels, Monmouth, Monmouthshire) (Temporary Traffic Restrictions and Prohibition) Order (SI 2011/1308)
- The M25, the M26 and the M20 Motorways and the A20 Trunk Road (Swanley Interchange, M25 Junctions 4 and 5 and M26 Junctions 3 – 1) (Temporary Prohibition of Traffic) Order (SI 2011/1309)
- The A483 Trunk Road (Junction 4, Northbound On and Off Slips and Southbound Off Slip, Wrexham) (Temporary Prohibition of Vehicles) Order (SI 2011/1310)
- The M40 Motorway (Junction 8a, Oxfordshire) Northbound Slip Roads (Temporary Prohibition of Traffic) Order (SI 2011/1311)
- The A421 Trunk Road (Wootton to Great Barford, Bedfordshire) (Temporary Restriction and Prohibition of Traffic) Order (SI 2011/1312)
- The A1 Trunk Road (Seaton Burn Interchange) (Temporary 50 Miles Per Hour Speed Restriction) Order (SI 2011/1313)
- The A19 Trunk Road (Tontine Junction to Crathorne Interchange) (Temporary Restriction and Prohibition of Traffic) Order (SI 2011/1314)
- The M2 Motorway (Junctions 4 – 6) (Temporary Restriction and Prohibition of Traffic) Order (SI 2011/1315)
- The A20 Trunk Road and the M20 and M26 Motorways (Crittalls Corner – M20 Junction 1 and M26 Junction 2A) (Temporary Prohibition of Traffic) Order (SI 2011/1316)
- The A21 Trunk Road (Tonbridge By-pass, Southbound) (Temporary Restriction and Prohibition of Traffic) Order (SI 2011/1317)
- The M1 Motorway (Junction 6 to Junction 9, Hertfordshire) (Temporary Prohibition of Traffic) Order (SI 2011/1318)
- The A1(M) Motorway (Junction 16 Norman Cross, Peterborough, City of Peterborough) Slip Roads (Temporary Prohibition of Traffic) Order (SI 2011/1319)
- The M40 Motorway (Junction 10, Ardley Interchange, Bicester, Oxfordshire) Northbound Exit Slip Road (Temporary Prohibition of Traffic) Order (SI 2011/1320)
- The Immigration (Designation of Travel Bans) (Amendment No.5) Order (SI 2011/1321)
- The A14 Trunk Road (Junction 13 Thrapston Interchange, Northamptonshire to Junction 21 Brampton Hut Interchange, Cambridgeshire) (Temporary Prohibition of Traffic) Order (SI 2011/1322)
- The A12 Trunk Road (Breydon Bridge, Great Yarmouth, Norfolk) (Temporary Prohibition of Traffic and Pedestrians) Order (SI 2011/1323)
- The A43 Trunk Road (Evenley Roundabout, South of Brackley, Northamptonshire) (Derestriction) Order (SI 2011/1324)
- The A46 Trunk Road (M69 Junction, North of Coventry) (50 Miles Per Hour Speed Limit) Order (SI 2011/1325)
- The A46 Trunk Road (North of Coventry) (Closure of Gap in the Central Reservation) Order (SI 2011/1326)
- The Medicines (Miscellaneous Amendments) Order (SI 2011/1327)
- The Family Procedure (Amendment) Rules (SI 2011/1328)
- The Magistrates’ Courts (Enforcement or Variation of Orders Made in Family Proceedings and Miscellaneous Provisions) Rules (SI 2011/1329)
- The Defence Science and Technology Laboratory Trading Fund Order (SI 2011/1330)
- The Community Legal Service (Financial) (Amendment) Regulations (SI 2011/1331)
- The A46 Trunk Road (Evesham, Worcestershire) (Temporary Restriction and Prohibition of Traffic) Order (SI 2011/1332)
- The M50 Motorway (Junctions 4 to 2) (Temporary Prohibition of Traffic) (No.2) Order (SI 2011/1333)
- The M6 Motorway (Junction 10 to Junction 9) (Temporary Prohibition of Traffic) Order (SI 2011/1334)
- The M6 Motorway (Junctions 12 to 13) (Temporary Prohibition of Traffic) Order (SI 2011/1335)
- The Debt Relief (Developing Countries) Act 2010 (Permanent Effect) Order (SI 2011/1336)
- The A417 Trunk Road (Air Balloon Roundabout to Burford Road Junction, Gloucestershire) (Temporary Prohibition of Traffic) Order (SI 2011/1337)
- The M5 Motorway (Junctions 11A-12) (Temporary Restriction of Traffic) Order (SI 2011/1338)
- The A4 Trunk Road and A46 Trunk Road (London Road Junction, Bath) (Temporary Prohibition of Traffic) (Number 2) Order (SI 2011/1339)
- The Regulation of Investigatory Powers (Monetary Penalty Notices and Consents for Interceptions) Regulations (SI 2011/1340)
- The M6 Motorway (Junction 24, Southbound Exit Slip Road) (Temporary Prohibition of Traffic) Order (SI 2011/1341)
- The M42 Motorway (Junction 5) (Slip Roads) (Temporary Prohibition of Traffic) ( 2) Order (SI 2011/1342)
- The A19 Trunk Road (Seaton Interchange) (Temporary Prohibition of Traffic) Order (SI 2011/1343)
- The M60 Motorway Junction 12 Anticlockwise (Link Road to the M62 Westbound and M602 Eastbound Carriageways) (Temporary Prohibition of Traffic) Order (SI 2011/1344)
- The Adoption and Children (Scotland) Act 2007 (Consequential Provisions) (Amendment) Order (SI 2011/1345)
- The A470 Trunk Road (Dolwyddelan, Conwy County Borough) (Temporary Traffic Restrictions & Prohibition) Order (SI 2011/1346)
- The Yarmouth (Isle of Wight) Harbour Revision Order (SI 2011/1347)
- The A470 Trunk Road (Red House Bends, Cwmbach, Powys) (Temporary Prohibition of Vehicles, Cyclists and Pedestrians) Order (SI 2011/1348)
- The Employment and Support Allowance (Work-Related Activity) Regulations (SI 2011/1349)
- The M62 Motorway (Junction 32, Castleford) (Temporary Prohibition of Traffic) (No.2) Order (SI 2011/1350)
- The A64 Trunk Road (Various Locations) (Temporary Restriction and Prohibition of Traffic) ( 2) Order (SI 2011/1351)
- The M5 Motorway (Junctions 26–27) (Temporary Restriction of Traffic) Order (SI 2011/1352)
- The M271 Motorway and the M27 Motorway (Romsey Road Roundabout – Redbridge Roundabout) (Temporary Restriction and Prohibition of Traffic) Order (SI 2011/1353)
- The Air Navigation (Restriction of Flying) (Visit by The President of the United States of America) (Revocation) Regulations (SI 2011/1354)
- The Air Navigation (Restriction of Flying) (State Visit by The President of the United States of America) Regulations (SI 2011/1355)
- The Air Navigation (Restriction of Flying) (Trooping the Colour) Regulations (SI 2011/1356)
- The M25 Motorway (Junction 6, Carriageways) (Temporary Prohibition of Traffic) Order (SI 2011/1357)
- The M11 Motorway (Junction 4, Northbound) (Temporary Prohibition of Traffic) Order (SI 2011/1358)
- The A303 Trunk Road (M3 Junction 8 – Parkhouse Interchange) (Temporary Restriction and Prohibition of Traffic) Order (SI 2011/1359)
- The A34 Trunk Road (East Ilsley, Southbound Entry Slip Road) (Temporary Prohibition of Traffic) Order (SI 2011/1360)
- The A34 Trunk Road (Abingdon, Pen Barn) (Temporary Restriction and Prohibition of Traffic) Order (SI 2011/1361)
- The A303 and the A34 Trunk Roads (Barton Stacey Interchange – Bullington Cross Interchange) (Temporary Restriction and Prohibition of Traffic) Order (SI 2011/1362)
- The A405 Trunk Road (M1 Junction 6 – M25 Junction 21A) (Temporary Prohibition of Traffic) Order (SI 2011/1363)
- The Armed Forces Pension Scheme 2005 (Amendment) Order (SI 2011/1364)
- The A3 Trunk Road (Horndean, Southbound) (Temporary Speed Restrictions) Order (SI 2011/1365)
- The Immigration Services Commissioner (Application Fee) Order (SI 2011/1366)
- The General Pharmaceutical Council (Continuing Professional Development and Consequential Amendments) Rules Order of Council (SI 2011/1367)
- The A2070 Trunk Road (Bad Munstereifel Road) (Temporary Restriction and Prohibition of Traffic) Order (SI 2011/1368)
- The Air Navigation (Restriction of Flying) (Staffordshire Royal Visit) Regulations (SI 2011/1369)
- The A36 Trunk Road (Black Dog Hill, Near Frome) (Temporary Restriction of Traffic) Order (SI 2011/1370)
- The M5 Motorway (Junctions 25–24) (Temporary Restriction of Traffic) Order (SI 2011/1371)
- The A30 Trunk Road (Victoria Interchange, Near Bodmin) (Temporary Prohibition of Traffic) Order (SI 2011/1372)
- The A66 Trunk Road (Spital Hill to Rovegill Bridge) (Temporary Restriction and Prohibition of Traffic) Order (SI 2011/1373)
- The A50 Trunk Road (Uttoxeter to Toyota Interchange) (Temporary Prohibition of Traffic) Order (SI 2011/1374)
- The M1 Motorway (Junction 29a) (Temporary 50 Miles Per Hour Speed Restriction) Order (SI 2011/1375)
- The M1 Motorway (Junction 29 and Junction 30) (Slip Roads) (Temporary Prohibition of Traffic) Order (SI 2011/1376)
- The Designation of Schools Having a Religious Character (England) (Amendment) Order (SI 2011/1377)
- The M69 Motorway (M1 Junction 21 to M69 Junction 1) (Temporary Restriction and Prohibition of Traffic) Order (SI 2011/1378)
- The A50 Trunk Road (Blythe Bridge to Uttoxeter) (Temporary Prohibition of Traffic) Order (SI 2011/1379)
- The A46 Trunk Road (Birchwood, Lincolnshire) (Temporary Restriction and Prohibition of Traffic) Order (SI 2011/1380)
- The A43 Trunk Road (Silverstone, Northamptonshire) (Temporary 50 Miles Per Hour Speed Restriction) Order (SI 2011/1381)
- The A14 Trunk Road (Junction with the A5199, Northamptonshire) (Slip Roads) (Temporary Prohibition of Traffic) Order (SI 2011/1382)
- The A36 Trunk Road (Hinton Charterhouse, Near Bath) (Temporary Restriction of Traffic) Order (SI 2011/1383)
- The M1 Motorway (Junction 14, Milton Keynes) Southbound Entry Slip Road (Temporary Prohibition of Traffic) Order (SI 2011/1384)
- The M40 Motorway (Junctions 1 – 15) (Temporary Prohibition of Traffic) Order (SI 2011/1385)
- The M40 Motorway (Junction 8 to Junction 9, Oxfordshire) (Temporary Prohibition of Traffic) Order (SI 2011/1386)
- The M62 Motorway Junction 10 (Westbound Link Road to the M6 Northbound) (Temporary Prohibition of Traffic) Order (SI 2011/1387)
- The A303 Trunk Road (Ilchester Mead to Cartgate Roundabout, Somerset) (Temporary Prohibition of Traffic) Order (SI 2011/1388)
- The M4 Motorway (Second Severn Crossing) (Temporary Prohibition and Restriction of Traffic) Order (SI 2011/1389)
- The A30 Trunk Road (Clyst Honiton to Sowton) and the M5 Motorway (Junction 29) (Temporary Restriction of Traffic) Order (SI 2011/1390)
- The M62 Motorway (Junction 24, Ainley) (Temporary Prohibition of Traffic) Order (SI 2011/1391)
- The A1(M) Motorway (Junction 42 to Junction 43 and Junction 44) (Temporary Prohibition of Traffic) Order (SI 2011/1392)
- The M6 Motorway (Junctions 22–24 Northbound Carriageway and Slip Roads) (Temporary Prohibition and Restriction of Traffic) Order (SI 2011/1393)
- The A487 Trunk Road (Tre’r-ddol and Tre Taliesin, Ceredigion) (30 mph and 40 mph Speed Limits) Order (SI 2011/1394)
- The A487 Trunk Road (Penglais Road, Aberystwyth, Ceredigion) (40 mph Speed Limit) Order (SI 2011/1395)
- The Charities (Pre-consolidation Amendments) Order (SI 2011/1396)
- The A470 Trunk Road (Gelligemlyn, Gwynedd) (Temporary Traffic Restrictions and Prohibitions) Order (SI 2011/1397)
- The European Regional Development Fund (Operational Programmes) Regulations (SI 2011/1398)
- The Local Government, Planning and Land Act 1980 (Amendment of Schedule 16) (England) Order (SI 2011/1399)
- The Air Navigation (Restriction of Flying) (Stokes Bay) Regulations (SI 2011/1400)

== 1401–1500 ==
- The A5 Trunk Road (Maerdy Conwy County Borough) (Temporary Traffic Restrictions & Prohibition) Order (SI 2011/1401)
- The Patents County Court (Financial Limits) Order (SI 2011/1402)
- The Overseas Territories (Change of Name) Order (SI 2011/1403)
- The Overseas Territories (Change of Name) ( 2) Order (SI 2011/1404)
- The Overseas Territories (Change of Name) ( 3) Order (SI 2011/1405)
- The Overseas Territories (Change of Name) ( 4) Order (SI 2011/1406)
- The Overseas Territories (Change of Name) ( 5) Order (SI 2011/1407)
- The Immigration (Isle of Man) (Amendment) Order (SI 2011/1408)
- The Assured Tenancies (Amendment of Rental Threshold) (Wales) Order (SI 2011/1409)
- The Land Registration (Amendment) Rules (SI 2011/1410)
- The Land Registration (Proper Office) (Amendment) Order (SI 2011/1411)
- The Air Navigation (Restriction of Flying) (Stokes Bay) (Revocation) Regulations (SI 2011/1412)
- The Air Navigation (Restriction of Flying) (Her Majesty The Queen's Birthday Flypast) (Amendment) Regulations (SI 2011/1413)
- The Warm Home Discount (Reconciliation) Regulations (SI 2011/1414)
- The M4 Motorway (Junction 7, Spur and Slip Roads) (Temporary Prohibition of Traffic) Order (SI 2011/1415)
- The M1 Motorway (Junction 27 to Junction 28) (Temporary 50 Miles Per Hour Speed Restriction) Order (SI 2011/1416)
- The A45 Trunk Road (Wellingborough, Northamptonshire) (Slip Roads) (Temporary Prohibition of Traffic) Order (SI 2011/1417)
- The Bribery Act 2010 (Commencement) Order (SI 2011/1418)
- The A3(M) Motorway (Junction 5, Northbound) (Temporary Prohibition of Traffic) Order (SI 2011/1419)
- The M3 Motorway (Junction 6) (Temporary Restriction and Prohibition of Traffic) ( 2) Order (SI 2011/1420)
- The A3 Trunk Road (Thursley Junction – Hindhead) (Temporary Prohibition of Traffic) Order (SI 2011/1421)
- The A2 Trunk Road (Marling Cross – Pepper Hill) (Temporary Restriction and Prohibition of Traffic) Order (SI 2011/1422)
- The M25, the M3 and the M4 Motorways (M25 Junctions 12 – 15) (Temporary Restriction and Prohibition of Traffic) Order (SI 2011/1423)
- The A31 Trunk Road (Palmersford Roundabout – Merley Roundabout) (Temporary Restriction and Prohibition of Traffic) Order (SI 2011/1424)
- The A2 Trunk Road (Dartford Heath, Slip Roads) (Temporary Prohibition of Traffic) Order (SI 2011/1425)
- The A494 Trunk Road (South West of Bryn Saith Marchog, Denbighshire) (Temporary Tr Restrictions and Prohibitions) Order (SI 2011/1426)
- The A35 Trunk Road (Kingston Ponds, Near Dorchester, Dorset) (Temporary Prohibition of Traffic) Order (SI 2011/1427)
- The A470 Trunk Road (Maenan, North of Llanrwst, Conwy) (Temporary Traffic Restrictions and Prohibition) Order (SI 2011/1428)
- The A11 Trunk Road (B1172/B1135 Wymondham Interchange to A47/B1172 Cringleford Interchange, Norfolk) (Temporary Prohibition of Traffic) Order (SI 2011/1429)
- The Air Navigation (Restriction of Flying) (Milford Haven) Regulations (SI 2011/1430)
- The Corporation Tax (Implementation of the Mergers Directive) Regulations (SI 2011/1431)
- The Castle College, Nottingham (Dissolution) Order (SI 2011/1432)
- The Rural Development Programme (Transfer and Appeals) (England) Regulations (SI 2011/1433)
- The Magistrates’ Courts (Domestic Violence Protection Order Proceedings) Rules (SI 2011/1434)
- The Credit Rating Agencies (Amendment) Regulations (SI 2011/1435)
- The Football Spectators (Seating) Order (SI 2011/1436)
- The Safety of Sports Grounds (Designation) Order (SI 2011/1437)
- The Information as to Provision of Education (England) (Amendment) Regulations (SI 2011/1438)
- The Calibration of Tanks of Vessels (EEC Requirements) (Revocation) Regulations (SI 2011/1439)
- The Crime and Security Act 2010 (Domestic Violence: Pilot Schemes) Order (SI 2011/1440)
- The Bribery Act 2010 (Consequential Amendments) Order (SI 2011/1441)
- The A14 Trunk Road (West of Junction 33 Milton, Cambridgeshire) (Temporary Prohibition of Traffic) Order (SI 2011/1442)
- The M1 Motorway (Junction 44, Junction 46 and Junction 47) and the M62 Motorway (Junction 28 and Junction 29) (Temporary Restriction and Prohibition of Traffic) Order (SI 2011/1443)
- The A1 Trunk Road (Catterick) (Temporary Restriction and Prohibition of Traffic) Order (SI 2011/1444)
- The A19 Trunk Road (Wolviston Interchange to Sheraton Interchange) (Temporary Restriction and Prohibition of Traffic) Order (SI 2011/1445)
- The M54 Motorway (Junctions 2 – 3) (Temporary Prohibition of Traffic) Order (SI 2011/1446)
- The A45 and A46 Trunk Roads (Baginton, Warwickshire) (Slip Road) (Temporary Prohibition of Traffic) Order (SI 2011/1447)
- The A38 Trunk Road (Alrewas, Staffordshire) (Temporary Prohibition of Traffic) Order (SI 2011/1448)
- The Conisborough College Order (SI 2011/1449)
- The Food Additives (Wales) (Amendment) ( 2) Regulations (SI 2011/1450)
- The A5 Trunk Road (Dordon, Warwickshire) (Temporary Restriction and Prohibition of Traffic) Order (SI 2011/1451)
- The Coroners and Justice Act 2009 (Commencement 7) Order (SI 2011/1452)
- The Criminal Defence Service (General) ( 2) (Amendment) Regulations (SI 2011/1453)
- The Air Navigation (Dangerous Goods) (Amendment) ( 2) Regulations (SI 2011/1454)
- The South East Lincolnshire Joint Strategic Planning Committee Order (SI 2011/1455)
- The Food Additives (England) (Amendment) (No.2) Regulations (SI 2011/1456)
- The Air Navigation (Restriction of Flying) (Weston Park) Regulations (SI 2011/1457)
- The Air Navigation (Restriction of Flying) (Northern Ireland International Airshow) Regulations (SI 2011/1458)
- The Air Navigation (Restriction of Flying) (Royal Air Force Leuchars) Regulations (SI 2011/1459)
- The Allocation and Transfer of Proceedings (Amendment) Order (SI 2011/1460)
- The Air Navigation (Restriction of Flying) (Milford Haven) (Revocation) Regulations (SI 2011/1461)
- The M42 Motorway (Junction 7) (Northbound Exit Link Road) (Temporary Prohibition of Traffic) Order (SI 2011/1462)
- The M60 Motorway (Junctions 1–2 Clockwise and Anticlockwise Carriageways and Slip Roads) (Temporary Prohibition and Restriction of Traffic) Order (SI 2011/1463)
- The Child Support (Miscellaneous Amendments) Regulations (SI 2011/1464)
- The Civil Courts (Amendment) Order (SI 2011/1465)
- The Electoral Registration Data Schemes Order (SI 2011/1466)
- The Representation of the People (Electoral Registration Data Schemes) Regulations (SI 2011/1467)
- The Education (Wales) Measure 2009 (Commencement No.1) Order (SI 2011/1468)
- The A40 Trunk Road (Holywell Road to Lower Monk Street, Abergavenny, Monmouthshire) (Temporary Prohibition of Vehicles & Cyclists) Order (SI 2011/1469)
- The M6 Motorway (Junction 16) (Temporary Prohibition of Traffic) Order (SI 2011/1470)
- The M1 Motorway (Junction 33 and Junction 34) and the M18 Motorway (Thurcroft Interchange) (Temporary Prohibition of Traffic) Order (SI 2011/1471)
- The A66 Trunk Road (Bowes Interchange to Scotch Corner Interchange) (Temporary Restriction and Prohibition of Traffic) Order (SI 2011/1472)
- The M45 Motorway (Thurlaston to M1 Junction 17) (Temporary Prohibition of Traffic) Order (SI 2011/1473)
- The A50 Trunk Road (Hilton to Foston, Derbyshire) (Temporary Prohibition of Traffic) Order (SI 2011/1474)
- The A50 Trunk Road (Blythe Bridge) (Temporary Restriction of Traffic) Order (SI 2011/1475)
- The M5 Motorway (Junction 6) (Southbound Entry Slip Road) (Temporary Prohibition of Traffic) Order (SI 2011/1476)
- The M42 Motorway (Junction 1) (Northbound Entry Slip Road) (Temporary Prohibition of Traffic) Order (SI 2011/1477)
- The A66 Trunk Road (Chapel Beck Aqueduct) (Temporary Restriction and Prohibition of Traffic) Order (SI 2011/1478)
- The A556 Trunk Road (A556/A56/M56 Roundabout to Millington Lane Crossroads) and the M56 Motorway (Temporary Prohibition and Restriction of Traffic) Order (SI 2011/1479)
- The M27 Motorway (Junctions 8 – 9) (Temporary Restriction of Traffic) Order (SI 2011/1480)
- The M23 Motorway (Junction 8, Southbound Carriageway) (Temporary Prohibition of Traffic) Order (SI 2011/1481)
- The M26 Motorway (Junction 2A, Slip Roads) (Temporary Prohibition of Traffic) Order (SI 2011/1482)
- The Storage of Carbon Dioxide (Termination of Licences) Regulations (SI 2011/1483)
- The Civil Jurisdiction and Judgments (Maintenance) Regulations (SI 2011/1484)
- The A14 Trunk Road (Junction 21 Brampton Hut Interchange to Junction 23 Spittals Interchange, Huntingdon, Cambridgeshire) (Temporary Prohibition of Traffic) Order (SI 2011/1485)
- The A14 Trunk Road (West of Junction 49 Tothill Interchange to East of Junction 50 Cedars Interchange, Stowmarket, Suffolk) (Temporary Restriction and Prohibition of Traffic) Order (SI 2011/1486)
- The Companies Act 2006 (Annual Returns) Regulations (SI 2011/1487)
- The A31 Trunk Road (Stag Gate – Almer Cross Roads) (Temporary 40 Miles Per Hour Speed Restriction) Order (SI 2011/1488)
- The M2 Motorway (Junctions 7 – 4, Londonbound) (Temporary Restriction and Prohibition of Traffic) Order (SI 2011/1489)
- The A21 Trunk Road (Morley's Interchange – Vauxhall Lane Junction) (Temporary Restriction and Prohibition of Traffic) Order (SI 2011/1490)
- The Nottingham Express Transit System (Amendment) Order (SI 2011/1491)
- The A45 Trunk Road (Wellingborough, Northamptonshire) (Temporary Prohibition of Traffic) Order (SI 2011/1492)
- The Justices of the Peace (Training and Development Committee) (Amendment) Rules (SI 2011/1493)
- The Youth Courts (Constitution of Committees and Right to Preside) (Amendment) Rules (SI 2011/1494)
- The Family Proceedings Courts (Constitution of Committees and Right to Preside) (Amendment) Rules (SI 2011/1495)
- The Orpington College of Further Education (Dissolution) Order (SI 2011/1496)
- The Social Security (Industrial Injuries) (Prescribed Diseases) Amendment Regulations (SI 2011/1497)
- The Social Security (Electronic Communications) Order (SI 2011/1498)
- The Safety of Sports Grounds (Designation) (No.2) Order (SI 2011/1499)
- The School Governance (Contracts) (England) (Revocation) Regulations (SI 2011/1500)

== 1501–1600 ==
- The Housing Renewal Grants (Prescribed Form and Particulars) (Revocation) (Wales) Regulations (SI 2011/1501)
- The Taxation of Equitable Life (Payments) Order (SI 2011/1502)
- The Media Ownership (Radio and Cross-media) Order (SI 2011/1503)
- The Barry College Further Education Corporation and Coleg Glan Hafren Further Education Corporation (Dissolution) Order (SI 2011/1504)
- The Pollution Prevention and Control (Designation of Directives) (England and Wales) Order (SI 2011/1505)
- The Greenhouse Gas Emissions Trading Scheme (Nitrous Oxide) Regulations (SI 2011/1506)
- The Wireless Telegraphy (Mobile Spectrum Trading) Regulations (SI 2011/1507)
- The Wireless Telegraphy (Register) (Amendment) ( 2) Regulations (SI 2011/1508)
- The Diseases of Animals (Approved Disinfectants) (Fees and Amendment) (England) Order (SI 2011/1509)
- The African Development Bank (Twelfth Replenishment of the African Development Fund) Order (SI 2011/1510)
- The African Development Fund (Multilateral Debt Relief Initiative) (Amendment) Order (SI 2011/1511)
- The African Development Bank (Further Payments to Capital Stock) Order (SI 2011/1512)
- The A483 Trunk Road (Ruabon Interchange (Junction 1), to Gresford Interchange (Junction 6), Wrexham) (Temporary 50 MPH Speed Limit) Order (SI 2011/1513)
- The Local Democracy, Economic Development and Construction Act 2009 (Commencement 1) (Wales) Order (SI 2011/1514)
- The Building (Amendment) Regulations (SI 2011/1515)
- The Humber Bridge (Revision of Tolls) Order (SI 2011/1516)
- The Plastic Kitchenware (Conditions on Imports from China) (England) Regulations (SI 2011/1517)
- The Nottinghamshire Healthcare National Health Service Trust (Establishment) Amendment Order (SI 2011/1518)
- The Shropshire Community Health National Health Service Trust (Establishment) Order (SI 2011/1519)
- The Worcestershire Health and Care National Health Service Trust (Establishment) and the Worcestershire Mental Health Partnership National Health Service Trust (Dissolution) Order (SI 2011/1520)
- The Royal Hospital of St Bartholomew, the Royal London Hospital and London Chest Hospital National Health Service Trust (Establishment) Amendment Order (SI 2011/1521)
- The A1 Trunk Road (Scotch Corner to Junction 56) (Temporary Restriction and Prohibition of Traffic) Order (SI 2011/1522)
- The Armed Forces (Terms of Service) (Amendment) Regulations (SI 2011/1523)
- The Energy Information Regulations (SI 2011/1524)
- The M48 Motorway (Junctions 1 – 2) (Severn Bridge) (Temporary Prohibition of Traffic) Order (SI 2011/1525)
- The A30 Trunk Road (Whiddon Down to Tongue End, Devon) (Temporary Prohibition of Traffic) Order (SI 2011/1526)
- The A303 Trunk Road (Stonehenge Summer Solstice, Wiltshire) (Temporary Prohibition and Restriction of Traffic) Order (SI 2011/1527)
- The A27 Trunk Road (Coldean Interchange – Falmer Interchange) (Temporary Restriction and Prohibition of Traffic) Order (SI 2011/1528)
- The M5 Motorway (Junctions 14–16) (Almondsbury Interchange) (Temporary Prohibition and Restriction of Traffic) Order (SI 2011/1529)
- The A38 Trunk Road (Landrake, Cornwall) (Temporary Prohibition and Restriction of Traffic) Order (SI 2011/1530)
- The A30 Trunk Road (Woodleigh to Whiddon Down, Near Cheriton Bishop, Devon) (Temporary Prohibition of Traffic) Order (SI 2011/1531)
- The A47 Trunk Road (A11 Thickthorn Interchange to A146 Interchange, Norwich, Norfolk) (Temporary Restriction and Prohibition of Traffic) Order (SI 2011/1532)
- The M60 Motorway (Junctions 11, 13 and 16 Anticlockwise and Clockwise Exit and Entry Slip Roads) (Temporary Prohibition of Traffic) Order (SI 2011/1533)
- The A3 Trunk Road (Hindhead) (Derestriction and Variable Speed Limit) Order (SI 2011/1534)
- The A3 Trunk Road (Hindhead) (Prohibition of Certain Classes of Traffic and Pedestrians) No 2 Order (SI 2011/1535)
- The M25 Motorway (Junction 14 and Terminal 5 Spur Roads) (Temporary Prohibition of Traffic) Order (SI 2011/1536)
- The A3 Trunk Road (Hindhead) (24 Hours Clearway) Order (SI 2011/1537)
- The A20 Trunk Road (Petham Court Bridge, Lay-By) (Temporary Prohibition of Traffic) Order (SI 2011/1538)
- The A34 Trunk Road (Bullington Cross, Southbound Exit Slip Road) (Temporary Prohibition of Traffic) Order (SI 2011/1539)
- The A34 Trunk Road (Speen – East Ilsley, Slip Roads) (Temporary Prohibition of Traffic) Order (SI 2011/1540)
- The M60 Motorway (Junction 21, Anticlockwise Entry Slip Road) (Temporary Prohibition of Traffic) Order (SI 2011/1541)
- The Distress for Rent (Amendment) Rules (SI 2011/1542)
- The Environmental Protection (Controls on Ozone-Depleting Substances) Regulations (SI 2011/1543)
- The M60 Motorway (Junctions 14–17) and Slip and Link Roads, and the M61 Motorway (Temporary Prohibition and Restriction of Traffic) Order (SI 2011/1544)
- The A47 Trunk Road (Easton Roundabout to A1042 Postwick Interchange, Norwich Southern Bypass, Norfolk) (Temporary Prohibition of Traffic) Order (SI 2011/1545)
- The M602 and M62 Motorways Junction 12 (Link Roads to the M60 Anticlockwise and Clockwise Carriageways) (Temporary Prohibition of Traffic) Order (SI 2011/1546)
- The M60 Motorway (Junction 20, Anticlockwise Entry Slip Road) (Temporary Prohibition of Traffic) Order (SI 2011/1547)
- The A66 Trunk Road (Bassenthwaite Lake) (Temporary Prohibition and Restriction of Traffic) (No 2) Order (SI 2011/1548)
- The A47 Trunk Road (Constitution Hill/A10/A149/Hardwick Road Interchange to A148 Saddlebow Road Interchange, King's Lynn, Norfolk) (Temporary Restriction and Prohibition of Traffic) Order (SI 2011/1549)
- The A483 Trunk Road (Various Locations between Builth Wells and Newtown, Powys) (Temporary Traffic Restrictions & Prohibition) Order (SI 2011/1550)
- The Care Quality Commission (Additional Functions) Regulations (SI 2011/1551)
- The NHS Foundation Trusts and Primary Care Trusts (Transfer of Trust Property) Order (SI 2011/1552)
- The Immigration (Passenger Transit Visa)(Amendment) Order (SI 2011/1553)
- The Social Security (Exemption from Claiming Retirement Pension) Regulations (SI 2011/1554)
- The A12 Trunk Road (B1375 Rackhams Corner Roundabout, Blundeston, Suffolk to Links Road Roundabout, Gorleston, Norfolk) (Temporary Restriction and Prohibition of Traffic) Order (SI 2011/1555)
- The National Health Service (Charges to Overseas Visitors) Regulations (SI 2011/1556)
- The A1 Trunk Road (South of B1041 to North of Bell Lane, Southoe, Cambridgeshire) Northbound (Temporary Restriction and Prohibition of Traffic) Order (SI 2011/1557)
- The M11 Motorway (Junction 14) and the A14 Trunk Road (Junction 29 Bar Hill Interchange to Junction 32 Histon Interchange, Cambridgeshire) (Temporary Restriction and Prohibition of Traffic) Order (SI 2011/1558)
- The A12 Trunk Road (Junction 21 to Junction 22, Essex) (Temporary Restriction and Prohibition of Traffic) Order (SI 2011/1559)
- The A14 Trunk Road (Junction 44 Moreton Hall Interchange to Junction 50 Cedars Interchange, Suffolk) (Temporary Restriction and Prohibition of Traffic) Order (SI 2011/1560)
- The A12 Trunk Road (Ardleigh, Essex) Southbound Exit Slip Road (Temporary Prohibition of Traffic) Order (SI 2011/1561)
- The A14 Trunk Road (Junction 36 Nine Mile Hill Interchange to Junction 32 Histon Interchange, Cambridgeshire) Westbound (Temporary Restriction and Prohibition of Traffic) Order (SI 2011/1562)
- The A47 Trunk Road (Hockering, Norfolk) (Temporary Restriction and Prohibition of Traffic) ( 2) Order (SI 2011/1563)
- The A1 Trunk Road (Water Newton, Cambridgeshire) Southbound (Temporary 50 Miles Per Hour Speed Restriction) Order (SI 2011/1564)
- The Saundersfoot Harbour Empowerment Order (SI 2011/1565)
- The Water Industry (Schemes for Adoption of Private Sewers) Regulations (SI 2011/1566)
- The Ionising Radiation (Medical Exposure) (Amendment) Regulations (SI 2011/1567)
- The Contracting Out (Local Authorities Social Services Functions) (England) Order (SI 2011/1568)
- The Local Democracy, Economic Development and Construction Act 2009 (Commencement 1) (England) Order (SI 2011/1569)
- The A40 Trunk Road (Crickhowell to Trecastle, Powys) (Temporary Traffic Prohibition and Restrictions) Order (SI 2011/1570)
- The A194(M) Motorway and the A184 Trunk Road (White Mare Pool Interchange) (Temporary Restriction and Prohibition of Traffic and Pedestrians) Order (SI 2011/1571)
- The A421 Trunk Road (M1 Junction 13 to Bedford) (De-Restriction) Order (SI 2011/1572)
- The Air Navigation (Restriction of Flying) (Jet Formation Display Teams) ( 2) (Amendment) Regulations (SI 2011/1573)
- The Air Navigation (Restriction of Flying) (Jet Formation Display Teams) ( 3) Regulations (SI 2011/1574)
- The A36 Trunk Road (Warminster Road, Bathampton, to Norton St Philip, Somerset) (Temporary Prohibition and Restriction of Traffic) (Number 2) Order (SI 2011/1575)
- The M6 Motorway (Junction 4) (Temporary Prohibition of Traffic) Order (SI 2011/1576)
- The M1 Motorway (Junction 15) (Temporary Prohibition of Traffic) Order (SI 2011/1577)
- The M1 Motorway (Junction 16 – Junction 15) (Temporary Restriction and Prohibition of Traffic) Order (SI 2011/1578)
- The A43 Trunk Road (Brackley to Towcester, Northamptonshire) (Silverstone British Grand Prix) (Temporary Restriction and Prohibition of Traffic) Order (SI 2011/1579)
- The A5 Trunk Road (Tamworth, Staffordshire) (Slip Roads) (Temporary Prohibition of Traffic) Order (SI 2011/1580)
- The M61 Motorway (Junctions 3- 2 Southbound Exit Slip and Link Roads) and Kearsley Spur (Temporary Prohibition of Traffic) Order (SI 2011/1581)
- The Local Democracy, Economic Development and Construction Act 2009 (Commencement 2) (England) Order (SI 2011/1582)
- The Finance Act 2009 (Consequential Amendments) Order (SI 2011/1583)
- The Income Tax (Pay As You Earn) (Amendment) (No.3) Regulations (SI 2011/1584)
- The Income Tax (Earnings and Pensions) Act 2003 (Section 684(3A)) Order (SI 2011/1585)
- The Welsh Language (Wales) Measure 2011 (Commencement No.1) Order (SI 2011/1586)
- The National Health Service (Travel Expenses and Remission of Charges) Amendment Regulations (SI 2011/1587)
- The Disabled Persons (Badges for Motor Vehicles) (Wales) (Amendment) Regulations (SI 2011/1588)
- The Town and Country Planning General (Amendment) (England) Regulations (SI 2011/1589)
- The M56 Motorway (Junction 1 Westbound Entry and Eastbound Exit Slip Roads) (Temporary Prohibition of Traffic) Order (SI 2011/1590)
- The M60 Motorway (Junction 3 Clockwise and Junction 25 Anticlockwise Entry Slip Roads) (Temporary Prohibition of Traffic) Order (SI 2011/1591)
- The A64 Trunk Road (Layby at Scampston) (Temporary Prohibition of Traffic) Order (SI 2011/1592)
- The Welsh Language Commissioner (Appointment) Regulations (SI 2011/1593)
- The A64 Trunk Road (Musley Bank Interchange to Pickering Interchange) (Temporary Restriction and Prohibition of Traffic) (No.2) Order (SI 2011/1594)
- The A1 Trunk Road (Stannington Interchange) (Temporary Restriction and Prohibition of Traffic) Order (SI 2011/1595)
- The A1(M) Motorway (Junction 42 to Junction 43 and Junction 44) and the A64 Trunk Road (Temporary Prohibition of Traffic) ( 2) Order (SI 2011/1596)
- The Local Democracy, Economic Development and Construction Act 2009 (Commencement 2) (Wales) Order (SI 2011/1597)
- The M62 Motorway (Junction 28 to Junction 29) (Temporary Prohibition of Traffic) Order (SI 2011/1598)
- The M20 Motorway and the A20 Trunk Road (Roundhill Viaduct) (Temporary Speed Restrictions) Order (SI 2011/1599)
- The M25 Motorway, the M1 Motorway and the A1(M) Motorway (M25 Junctions 21 & 24, M1 Junctions 1 – 4 and A1(M) Junction 3) (Temporary Restriction and Prohibition of Traffic) Order (SI 2011/1600)

== 1601–1700 ==
- The Portsmouth Road, Hindhead, Surrey (40 Miles Per Hour Speed Limit) Order (SI 2011/1601)
- The Climate Change Act 2008 (Credit Limit) Order (SI 2011/1602)
- The Carbon Budget Order (SI 2011/1603)
- The Portsmouth Road, Hindhead, Surrey (Restricted Road) Order (SI 2011/1604)
- The Plastic Kitchenware (Conditions on Imports from China) (Wales) Regulations (SI 2011/1605)
- The Companies (Reporting Requirements in Mergers and Divisions) Regulations (SI 2011/1606)
- The Gender Recognition Register (Amendment) Regulations (SI 2011/1607)
- The Recovery of Import Duties and Export Duties (Andorra) (Amendment) Regulations (SI 2011/1608)
- The Civil Courts (Amendment 2) Order (SI 2011/1609)
- The Airports Slot Allocation (Amendment) Regulations (SI 2011/1610)
- The A34 Trunk Road (M3 Junction 9 – Andover Road Interchange) (Temporary Prohibition of Traffic) Order (SI 2011/1611)
- The A3(M) Motorway (Junction 4, Northbound Exit Slip Road) (Temporary Prohibition of Traffic) Order (SI 2011/1612)
- The Undertakings for Collective Investment in Transferable Securities Regulations (SI 2011/1613)
- The A1(M) Motorway (Junction 7 Stevenage, Hertfordshire) Slip Roads (Temporary Prohibition of Traffic) Order (SI 2011/1614)
- The A1(M) Motorway (Junction 7 to South of Junction 10, Hertfordshire) (Temporary Restriction and Prohibition of Traffic) Order (SI 2011/1615)
- The A30 Trunk Road (Carland Cross to Highgate Hill, Cornwall) (Temporary Prohibition and Restriction of Traffic) Order (SI 2011/1616)
- The M60 Motorway (Junction 25, Anticlockwise Entry Slip Road) (Temporary Prohibition of Traffic) Order (SI 2011/1617)
- The M53 Motorway (Junction 1 Northbound Exit and Southbound Entry Slip Roads to and from the Wallasey Docks Road) (Temporary Prohibition of Traffic) Order (SI 2011/1618)
- The M62 Motorway (Junction 21, Westbound Exit Slip Road) (Temporary Prohibition of Traffic) Order (SI 2011/1619)
- The M6 Motorway (Junction 21 Northbound Entry Slip Road) and (Junction 21A Southbound Link Road to the M62 Eastbound) (Temporary Prohibition of Traffic) Order (SI 2011/1620)
- The M6 Motorway (Junctions 44-43 Southbound Carriageway) (Temporary Restriction of Traffic) Order (SI 2011/1621)
- The A38 Trunk Road (South Brent, Devon) (Temporary Prohibition and Restriction of Traffic) Order (SI 2011/1622)
- The A30 Trunk Road (Alphington to Pearce's Hill), A38 Trunk Road (Pearce's Hill to Kennford) and M5 Motorway (Junction 31) (Temporary Prohibition and Restriction of Traffic) Order (SI 2011/1623)
- The A35 Trunk Road (Dorchester Bypass) (Temporary Prohibition of Traffic) Order (SI 2011/1624)
- The Education (Pupil Registration) (England) (Amendment) Regulations (SI 2011/1625)
- The Financial Services and Markets Act 2000 (Exemption) (Amendment) Order (SI 2011/1626)
- The Education (Non-Maintained Special Schools) (England) Regulations (SI 2011/1627)
- The Childcare (Fees) (Amendment) Regulations (SI 2011/1628)
- The A419 Trunk Road (Calcutt Overbridge, Cricklade) (Temporary Prohibition of Traffic) Order (SI 2011/1629)
- The Gender Recognition (Approved Countries and Territories) Order (SI 2011/1630)
- The Cleaner Road Transport Vehicles Regulations (SI 2011/1631)
- The M5 Motorway (Junctions 11–10) (Temporary Restriction of Traffic) Order (SI 2011/1632)
- The M60 Motorway (Junction 5, Clockwise Exit Slip Road) (Temporary Prohibition of Traffic) Order (SI 2011/1633)
- The M60 Motorway (Junction 5, Clockwise Entry Slip Road from the A5103 Northbound) (Temporary Prohibition of Traffic) Order (SI 2011/1634)
- The M6 Motorway (Junction 29 Northbound Link Road to the M65 Westbound) (Temporary Prohibition of Traffic) Order (SI 2011/1635)
- The Equality Act 2010 (Commencement 7) Order (SI 2011/1636)
- The M60 Motorway (Junction 8, Clockwise Exit Slip Road) (Temporary Prohibition of Traffic) Order (SI 2011/1637)
- The M61 Motorway (Junction 2 Northbound Link Road to the M61 Kearsley Spur and Southbound Link Roads to the A580 Eastbound) (Temporary Prohibition of Traffic) Order (SI 2011/1638)
- The M61 Motorway (Junctions 6-2 Southbound Carriageway and Northbound and Southbound Slip Roads) (Temporary Prohibition and Restriction of Traffic) Order (SI 2011/1639)
- The M62 Motorway (Junctions 9–12 Eastbound and Westbound Carriageways, Slip and Link Roads) and the M6 (Junction 21A Link Road) (Temporary Prohibition and Restriction of Traffic) Order (SI 2011/1640)
- The M60 Motorway (Junction 23 Clockwise Entry Slip Roads) (Temporary Prohibition of Traffic) Order (SI 2011/1641)
- The A38 Trunk Road (Swinfen to Clay Mills, Staffordshire) (Slip Roads) (Temporary Prohibition of Traffic) Order (SI 2011/1642)
- The M602 and M62 Motorways (and Link Roads) and M60 Motorway (Junctions 11 and 14 Anticlockwise Exit Slip Roads) (Temporary Prohibition of Traffic) Order (SI 2011/1643)
- The M56 Motorway (Junction 5 Westbound Entry Slip Road from the Manchester International Airport Spur) (Temporary Prohibition of Traffic) Order (SI 2011/1644)
- The M6 Motorway (Junction 4) and The M42 Motorway (Junction 7) (Temporary Prohibition of Traffic) Order (SI 2011/1645)
- The M6 Motorway (Junctions 10a to 16) (Temporary Prohibition of Traffic) Order (SI 2011/1646)
- The M50 Motorway (Junction 2 to M5 Junction 8) (Temporary Prohibition of Traffic) Order (SI 2011/1647)
- The A5 Trunk Road (Smockington, Leicestershire) (Temporary Prohibition of Traffic) Order (SI 2011/1648)
- The A50 Trunk Road (Catchems Corner, Stoke-on-Trent) (Slip Road) (Temporary Prohibition of Traffic) Order (SI 2011/1649)
- The M6 Motorway (Junction 41, Northbound Exit Slip Road) (Temporary Prohibition of Traffic) Order (SI 2011/1650)
- The Right of a Child to Make a Disability Discrimination Claim (Schools) (Wales) Order (SI 2011/1651)
- The Road Traffic (Drink and Drugs) (Cambridgeshire Guided Busway) Regulations (SI 2011/1652)
- The Wildlife and Countryside (Registration, Ringing and Marking of Certain Captive Birds) (Wales) Regulations (SI 2011/1653)
- The Cancellation of Student Loans for Living Costs Liability (Wales) Regulations (SI 2011/1654)
- The Feed-in Tariffs (Specified Maximum Capacity and Functions) (Amendment No.2) Order (SI 2011/1655)
- The Olympic Route Network Designation (Amendment) Order (SI 2011/1656)
- The M56 Motorway (Junction 12 Westbound Entry Slip Road) (Temporary Prohibition of Traffic) Order (SI 2011/1657)
- The Prisoners’ Earnings Act 1996 (Commencement) (England and Wales) Order (SI 2011/1658)
- The Legal Services Act 2007 (Licensing Authorities) (Maximum Penalty) Rules (SI 2011/1659)
- The A38 Trunk Road (Marsh Mills to Deep Lane, Plymouth) (Temporary Prohibition and Restriction of Traffic) Order (SI 2011/1660)
- The M1 Motorway (Junction 45 to Junction 42) (Temporary Prohibition of Traffic) Order (SI 2011/1661)
- The North Somerset Levels Internal Drainage Board Order (SI 2011/1662)
- The Prison and Young Offender Institution (Amendment) Rules (SI 2011/1663)
- The Non-Domestic Rating (Small Business Rate Relief) (England) (Amendment) Order (SI 2011/1664)
- The Non-Domestic Rating (Collection and Enforcement) (Local Lists) (Amendment) (England) (No.2) Regulations (SI 2011/1665)
- The Social Care Charges (Miscellaneous Amendments) (Wales) Regulations (SI 2011/1666)
- The Community Care, Services for Carers and Children's Services (Direct Payments) (Wales) (Amendment) Regulations (SI 2011/1667)
- The Prospectus Regulations (SI 2011/1668)
- The A36 Trunk Road (Wind Whistle Lane, Alderbury, Wiltshire) (Temporary Prohibition of Traffic) Order (SI 2011/1669)
- The A19 Trunk Road (Seaton Interchange to Easington Interchange) (Temporary Restriction and Prohibition of Traffic) Order (SI 2011/1670)
- The A36 Trunk Road (Norridge Common, Near Warminster) (Temporary Restriction of Traffic) Order (SI 2011/1671)
- The A1 Trunk Road (A47 Wansford Junction to A43/A16 Wothorpe Junction, Cambridgeshire) Northbound (Temporary Prohibition of Traffic) Order (SI 2011/1672)
- The M4 Motorway (East of Junction 15) (Temporary Restriction of Traffic) Order (SI 2011/1673)
- The A34 Trunk Road (Northeast of Chilton Interchange – West Ilsley Interchange, Southbound) (Temporary Restriction and Prohibition of Traffic) Order (SI 2011/1674)
- The Joseph Priestley College, Leeds (Dissolution) Order (SI 2011/1675)
- The Leeds College of Art (Transfer to the Higher Education Sector) Order (SI 2011/1676)
- The Leeds College of Music (Dissolution) Order (SI 2011/1677)
- The Syria (Restrictive Measures) (Overseas Territories) Order (SI 2011/1678)
- The Egypt (Restrictive Measures) (Overseas Territories) Order (SI 2011/1679)
- The Clyde Dockyard Port of Gareloch and Loch Long Order (SI 2011/1680)
- The Turks and Caicos Islands Constitution Order (SI 2011/1681)
- The Natural History Museum (Authorised Repositories) Order (SI 2011/1682)
- The European Communities (Designation) Order (SI 2011/1683)
- The Double Taxation Relief (Qatar) Order (SI 2011/1684)
- The International Tax Enforcement (Belize) Order (SI 2011/1685)
- The International Tax Enforcement (Dominica) Order (SI 2011/1686)
- The International Tax Enforcement (Grenada) Order (SI 2011/1687)
- The International Tax Enforcement (San Marino) Order (SI 2011/1688)
- The Ministerial and other Salaries Act 1975 (Amendment) Order (SI 2011/1689)
- The Chief Regulator of Qualifications and Examinations Order (SI 2011/1690)
- The Consular Fees (Amendment) Order (SI 2011/1691)
- The Exempt Charities Order (SI 2011/1692)
- The Portland (The London 2012 Olympic and Paralympic Games) Harbour Revision Order (SI 2011/1693)
- The Weymouth (The London 2012 Olympic and Paralympic Games) Harbour Revision Order (SI 2011/1694)
- The Designation of Schools Having a Religious Character (Independent Schools) (England) ( 3) Order (SI 2011/1695)
- The International Criminal Court (Libya) Order (SI 2011/1696)
- The M25 and the M11 Motorways (M25 Junctions 25 – 27 and M11 Junction 5) (Temporary Restriction and Prohibition of Traffic) Order (SI 2011/1697)
- The A3 Trunk Road (Painshill Interchange, Slip Roads) (Temporary Prohibition of Traffic) Order (SI 2011/1698)
- The A14 Trunk Road (Junction 28 to Junction 25, Cambridgeshire) Westbound (Temporary Prohibition of Traffic) Order (SI 2011/1699)
- The A428 Trunk Road (B1428 Cambridge Road St. Neots to Cambourne, Cambridgeshire) (Temporary Prohibition of Traffic) Order (SI 2011/1700)

== 1701–1800 ==
- The A66 Trunk Road (East Mellwaters to Bowes) (Temporary Restriction and Prohibition of Traffic) Order (SI 2011/1701)
- The Parliamentary Voting System and Constituencies Act 2011 (Repeal of Alternative Vote Provisions) Order (SI 2011/1702)
- The Horserace Betting and Olympic Lottery Act 2004 (Appointed Day) Order (SI 2011/1703)
- The Horserace Betting and Olympic Lottery Act 2004 (Commencement No.5) Order (SI 2011/1704)
- The A27 Trunk Road (Warblington Interchange – Fishbourne Roundabout) (Temporary Prohibition of Traffic) Order (SI 2011/1705)
- The National Health Service (Concerns, Complaints and Redress Arrangements) (Wales) (Amendment) Regulations (SI 2011/1706)
- The Social Security (Miscellaneous Amendments) ( 2) Regulations (SI 2011/1707)
- The Local Justice Areas ( 2) Order (SI 2011/1708)
- The Criminal Procedure Rules (SI 2011/1709)
- The Gambling Act 2005 (Gaming Machines in Adult Gaming Centres and Bingo Premises) Order (SI 2011/1710)
- The Categories of Gaming Machine (Amendment) Regulations (SI 2011/1711)
- The Legal Services Act 2007 (Appeals from Licensing Authority Decisions) Order (SI 2011/1712)
- The Construction Contracts (Wales) Exclusion Order (SI 2011/1713)
- The A27 Trunk Road (Portfield Roundabout – Bognor Road Roundabout) (Temporary Restriction and Prohibition of Traffic) Order (SI 2011/1714)
- The Scheme for Construction Contracts (England and Wales) Regulations 1998 (Amendment) (Wales) Regulations (SI 2011/1715)
- The Legal Services Act 2007 (The Law Society and The Council for Licensed Conveyancers) (Modification of Functions) Order (SI 2011/1716)
- The Church of England Pensions (Sodor and Man) (Amendment) Regulations (SI 2011/1717)
- The Humber Bridge (Debts) Order (SI 2011/1718)
- The Poultrymeat (Wales) Regulations (SI 2011/1719)
- The Justice and Security (Northern Ireland) Act 2007 (Extension of duration of non-jury trial provisions) Order (SI 2011/1720)
- The Justices of the Peace Act 1949 (Compensation) (Revocation) Regulations (SI 2011/1721)
- The A1 Trunk Road (Eighton Lodge Interchange) (Temporary Prohibition of Traffic) Order (SI 2011/1722)
- The A66 Trunk Road (Scotch Corner to Greta Bridge) (Temporary 10 Miles Per Hour and 40 Miles Per Hour Speed Restriction) Order (SI 2011/1723)
- The Pensions Act 2007 (Abolition of Contracting-out for Defined Contribution Pension Schemes) (Consequential Amendments) ( 2) Regulations (SI 2011/1724)
- The Charities Act 2006 (Changes in Exempt Charities) Order (SI 2011/1725)
- The Charities Act 2006 (Principal Regulators of Exempt Charities) Regulations (SI 2011/1726)
- The Charities Act 2006 (Principal Regulators of Exempt Charities) ( 2) Regulations (SI 2011/1727)
- The Charities Act 2006 (Commencement 8, Transitional Provisions and Savings) Order (SI 2011/1728)
- The Payments to the Churches Conservation Trust Order (SI 2011/1729)
- The Pensions Act 2008 (Abolition of Protected Rights) (Consequential Amendments) (No.2) Order (SI 2011/1730)
- The Ecclesiastical Judges, Legal Officers and Others (Fees) Order (SI 2011/1731)
- The A5 Trunk Road (Bridgtown, Staffordshire) (Temporary 10 Miles Per Hour Speed Restriction) Order (SI 2011/1732)
- The Co-operation in Public Protection Arrangements (UK Border Agency) Order (SI 2011/1733)
- The Court Funds Rules (SI 2011/1734)
- The Legal Officers (Annual Fees) Order (SI 2011/1735)
- The Housing Benefit (Amendment) Regulations (SI 2011/1736)
- The Supreme Court Fees (Amendment) Order (SI 2011/1737)
- The Extraction Solvents in Food (Amendment) (England) Regulations (SI 2011/1738)
- The Criminal Procedure (Legal Assistance, Detention and Appeals) (Scotland) Act 2010 (Consequential Provisions) Order (SI 2011/1739)
- The Adoption and Children (Scotland) Act 2007 (Consequential Modifications) Order (SI 2011/1740)
- The Borders, Citizenship and Immigration Act 2009 (Commencement No.2) Order (SI 2011/1741)
- The M5 Motorway (Junction 5, Wychbold) (Northbound Slip Roads) (Temporary Prohibition of Traffic) Order (SI 2011/1742)
- The A483 Trunk Road (Llynclys, Shropshire) (Temporary 10 Miles Per Hour Speed Restriction) Order (SI 2011/1743)
- The M5 Motorway (Junction 3) (Northbound Entry Slip Road) (Temporary Prohibition of Traffic) Order (SI 2011/1744)
- The A40 Trunk Road (Junction with the A4137, Herefordshire) (Slip Road) (Temporary Prohibition of Traffic) Order (SI 2011/1745)
- The A50 Trunk Road (Uttoxeter, Staffordshire) (Slip Road) (Temporary Prohibition of Traffic) Order (SI 2011/1746)
- The M1 Motorway (South of Junction 15) (Temporary Prohibition of Traffic) Order (SI 2011/1747)
- The A30 Trunk Road (Innis Downs Junction, Near Bodmin) (Temporary Prohibition of Traffic) Order (SI 2011/1748)
- The M5 Motorway (Junctions 28–29) (Temporary Prohibition of Traffic) Order (SI 2011/1749)
- The A1 Trunk Road (Highfields Roundabout to the Scottish Border) (Temporary Restriction and Prohibition of Traffic) Order (SI 2011/1750)
- The Registered Pension Schemes (Miscellaneous Amendments) Regulations (SI 2011/1751)
- The Registered Pension Schemes (Lifetime Allowance Transitional Protection) Regulations (SI 2011/1752)
- The Betting and Gaming Duties Act 1981 (Amendment) Order (SI 2011/1753)
- The Violent Crime Reduction Act 2006 (Specification for Imitation Firearms) Regulations (SI 2011/1754)
- The A30 Trunk Road (Treswithian Junction, Camborne, to St Erth Roundabout, Hayle) (Temporary Prohibition of Traffic) Order (SI 2011/1755)
- The M180 Motorway (Junction 1 to Junction 3) (Temporary Prohibition of Traffic) Order (SI 2011/1756)
- The M1 Motorway and the M62 Motorway (Lofthouse Interchange) (Temporary Prohibition of Traffic) (No.2) Order (SI 2011/1757)
- The M60, M66 and M62 Motorways (Junction 18 Simister Island Dedicated Link Roads) (Temporary Prohibition of Traffic) Order (SI 2011/1758)
- The M60 Motorway (Junction 3, Clockwise Entry Slip Road from the A34 Northbound) (Temporary Prohibition of Traffic) Order (SI 2011/1759)
- The M60 and M62 Motorways Junction 18 (Simister Island) (Temporary Prohibition of Traffic) Order (SI 2011/1760)
- The Legislative Reform (Epping Forest) Order (SI 2011/1761)
- The Air Navigation (Restriction of Flying) (Boston) Regulations (SI 2011/1762)
- The Air Navigation (Restriction of Flying) (Boston) (Revocation) Regulations (SI 2011/1763)
- The Air Navigation (Restriction of Flying) (Trenance Cornwall) Regulations (SI 2011/1764)
- The Air Navigation (Restriction of Flying) (Trenance Cornwall) (Revocation) Regulations (SI 2011/1765)
- The International Monetary Fund (Increase in Subscription) Order (SI 2011/1766)
- The Inter-American Development Bank (Further Payments to Capital Stock) Order (SI 2011/1767)
- The Inter-American Development Bank (Contribution to the Fund for Special Operations) Order (SI 2011/1768)
- The Head Teachers' Qualifications and Registration (Wales) (Amendment) Regulations (SI 2011/1769)
- The Flood and Water Management Act 2010 (Commencement 1 and Transitional Provisions) (England) Order (SI 2011/1770)
- The Equality Act 2010 (Work on Ships and Hovercraft) Regulations (SI 2011/1771)
- The Caribbean Development Bank (Further Payments to Capital Stock) Order (SI 2011/1772)
- The Communications Act 2003 (Maximum Penalty for Contravention of Information Requirements) Order (SI 2011/1773)
- The A556 Trunk Road (RHS Flower Show) (Temporary Prohibition of Right Turns) Order (SI 2011/1774)
- The M6 Motorway (Junctions 15 to 16) (Temporary Prohibition of Traffic) Order (SI 2011/1775)
- The A30 Trunk Road (Plusha, Near Launceston) (Temporary Restriction of Traffic) Order (SI 2011/1776)
- The A419 Trunk Road (Castle Eaton, Kingshill and Lower Widhill Farm Junctions, Near Cricklade, Wiltshire) (Temporary Prohibition of Traffic) Order (SI 2011/1777)
- The M1 Motorway (Junction 9, Hertfordshire) Northbound Entry Slip Road (Temporary Prohibition of Traffic) Order (SI 2011/1778)
- The Immigration (Provision of Physical Data) (Amendment) Regulations (SI 2011/1779)
- The Individual Savings Account (Amendment 2) Regulations (SI 2011/1780)
- The Money Laundering (Amendment) Regulations (SI 2011/1781)
- The Taxation of Pension Schemes (Transitional Provisions) (Amendment) (No.2) Order (SI 2011/1782)
- The Registered Pension Schemes (Relevant Income) Regulations (SI 2011/1783)
- The Corporation Tax Act 2010 (Factors Determining Substantial Commercial Interdependence) Order (SI 2011/1784)
- The Corporation Tax (Instalment Payments) (Amendment) Regulations (SI 2011/1785)
- The Nationality, Immigration and Asylum Act 2002 (Juxtaposed Controls) (Amendment) Order (SI 2011/1786)
- The Income Tax (Manufactured Overseas Dividends) (Amendment) Regulations (SI 2011/1787)
- The Sexual Offences Act 2003 (Prescribed Police Stations) Regulations (SI 2011/1788)
- The A1(M) Motorway and the A1 Trunk Road (B1043 Overbridge, Alconbury to Woolley, Huntingdon, Cambridgeshire) Southbound (Temporary Restriction and Prohibition of Traffic) Order (SI 2011/1789)
- The Registered Pension Schemes (Transfer of Sums and Assets) (Amendment) ( 2) Regulations (SI 2011/1790)
- The Registered Pension Schemes (Modification of Scheme Rules) Regulations (SI 2011/1791)
- The Registered Pension Schemes (Prescribed Requirements of Flexible Drawdown Declaration) Regulations (SI 2011/1792)
- The Registered Pension Schemes (Notice of Joint Liability for the Annual Allowance Charge) Regulations (SI 2011/1793)
- The Gaming Duty (Amendment) Regulations (SI 2011/1794)
- The Beer (Amendment) Regulations (SI 2011/1795)
- The Veterinary Surgeons (Recognition of University Degree) (Nottingham) Order of Council (SI 2011/1796)
- The Registered Pension Schemes (Provision of Information) (Amendment) (No.2) Regulations (SI 2011/1797)
- The Employer Supported Childcare (Relevant Earnings and Excluded Amounts) Regulations (SI 2011/1798)
- The Distribution of Dormant Account Money (Apportionment) Order (SI 2011/1799)
- The Rehabilitation of Offenders Act 1974 (Exceptions) (Amendment) (England and Wales) Order (SI 2011/1800)

== 1801–1900 ==
- The Occupational Pension Schemes (Assignment, Forfeiture, Bankruptcy etc.) (Amendment) Regulations (SI 2011/1801)
- The A1(M) Motorway (Junction 10) and the A1 Trunk Road (Stotfold to Black Cat Roundabout, Near Roxton, Bedfordshire) (Temporary Prohibition of Traffic) Order (SI 2011/1802)
- The M1 Motorway (Junctions 5 – 6a, Link/Slip Roads) (Temporary Prohibition of Traffic) Order (SI 2011/1803)
- The M25 Motorway (Holmesdale Tunnel) (Temporary Restriction and Prohibition of Traffic) Order (SI 2011/1804)
- The A34 Trunk Road (Hinksey Hill Interchange, Southbound Exit Slip Road) (Temporary Prohibition of Traffic) Order (SI 2011/1805)
- The M20 Motorway (Junction 2, Slip Roads) (Temporary Prohibition of Traffic) Order (SI 2011/1806)
- The A40 Trunk Road (Denham Roundabout) (Temporary Prohibition of Traffic) Order (SI 2011/1807)
- The A3 Trunk Road (M25 Junction 10 – Hammer Lane Junction) (Temporary Restriction and Prohibition of Traffic) Order (SI 2011/1808)
- The M25 Motorway (Junctions 17 – 25) (Temporary Prohibition of Traffic) Order (SI 2011/1809)
- The M4 Motorway (Junctions 3 – 5, Link and Slip Roads) (Temporary Prohibition of Traffic) Order (SI 2011/1810)
- The A249 Trunk Road (Grovehurst Road Junction, Slip Road) (Temporary Prohibition of Traffic) Order (SI 2011/1811)
- The A63 Trunk Road and the M62 Motorway (South Cave Interchange to Junction 37) (Temporary Prohibition of Traffic) Order (SI 2011/1812)
- The Land Registration (Network Access) (Amendment) Rules (SI 2011/1813)
- The A30 Trunk Road (Tolvaddon Junction, Pool, Redruth) (Temporary Prohibition and Restriction of Traffic) Order (SI 2011/1814)
- The M53 Motorway (Junction 3 Southbound Exit and Entry Slip Roads) (Temporary Prohibition of Traffic) Order (SI 2011/1815)
- The M61 Motorway (Junction 5 Northbound Exit Slip Road) (Temporary Prohibition of Traffic) Order (SI 2011/1816)
- The M53 Motorway (Junction 10 Northbound and Southbound Exit Slip Roads) (Temporary Prohibition of Traffic) Order (SI 2011/1817)
- The A38 Trunk Road (Twelvewoods Roundabout to Looe Mills Junction, Dobwalls, Cornwall) (Temporary Prohibition of Traffic) Order (SI 2011/1818)
- The M6 Motorway (Junction 6, Gravelly Hill) (Slip Roads) (Temporary Prohibition of Traffic) ( 4) Order (SI 2011/1819)
- The M54 Motorway and the A5 Trunk Road (Cluddley to Preston, Shropshire) (Temporary Prohibition of Traffic) ( 2) Order (SI 2011/1820)
- The A500 Trunk Road (Tunstall Interchange to Talke Roundabout, Staffordshire) (Temporary Prohibition of Traffic) Order (SI 2011/1821)
- The A1 Trunk Road (East Ord Roundabout to Duns Road) (Temporary Restriction and Prohibition of Traffic) Order (SI 2011/1822)
- The A40 Trunk Road (Travellers Rest to Pensarn Roundabout, Carmarthenshire) (Temporary Traffic Restrictions and Prohibitions) Order (SI 2011/1823)
- The Town and Country Planning (Environmental Impact Assessment) Regulations (SI 2011/1824)
- The Offshore Installations (Safety Zones) (No.2) Order (SI 2011/1825)
- The Beef and Pig Carcase Classification (Wales) Regulations (SI 2011/1826)
- The M18 Motorway (Junction 4 to Junction 5) (Temporary Prohibition of Traffic) Order (SI 2011/1827)
- The A64 Trunk Road (Pickering Interchange to Brambling Fields Interchange) (Temporary Restriction and Prohibition of Traffic) Order (SI 2011/1828)
- The River Humber (The Deep Tidal Stream Generator) Order (SI 2011/1829)
- The Disclosure of State Pension Credit Information (Warm Home Discount) Regulations (SI 2011/1830)
- The M23 Motorway (Junctions 8 – 9, Southbound) (Temporary Restriction of Traffic) Order (SI 2011/1831)
- The A27 Trunk Road (Hangleton Interchange – Sussex Pad Junction) (Temporary Restriction and Prohibition of Traffic) Order (SI 2011/1832)
- The A2 Trunk Road (Cobham Junction, Londonbound Exit Slip Road) (Temporary Prohibition of Traffic) Order (SI 2011/1833)
- The A3 Trunk Road (Hammer Lane Junction – A3(M) Junction 1) (Temporary Restriction and Prohibition of Traffic) Order (SI 2011/1834)
- The M20 Motorway and the A20 Trunk Road (Roundhill Viaduct) (Temporary Speed Restriction) ( 2) Order (SI 2011/1835)
- The A11 Trunk Road (Swaffham Heath Road Overbridge to M11/A1301 Interchange Junction 9a, Cambridgeshire) (Temporary Prohibition of Traffic) Order (SI 2011/1836)
- The A1(M) Motorway (Junction 16 Norman Cross to Junction 15 Sawtry, Cambridgeshire) (Temporary Restriction and Prohibition of Traffic) Order (SI 2011/1837)
- The A120 Trunk Road (Marks Farm Roundabout, Braintree, Essex) (Temporary 40 Miles Per Hour and 50 Miles Per Hour Speed Restriction) Order (SI 2011/1838)
- The A50 Trunk Road (Willington, Derbyshire) (Temporary Prohibition of Traffic) Order (SI 2011/1839)
- The M40 Motorway (Junctions 3 to 12) and the A40 and A404 Trunk Roads (Temporary Prohibition of Traffic) Order (SI 2011/1840)
- The A5 Trunk Road (A421 Redmoor Interchange, Milton Keynes to the A505 Thorn, Bedfordshire) (Temporary Prohibition of Traffic) Order (SI 2011/1841)
- The A1 Trunk Road (Buckden to Diddington, Cambridgeshire) (Temporary Prohibition of Traffic) Order (SI 2011/1842)
- The M11 Motorway (Junctions 4 – 6) (Temporary Prohibition of Traffic) Order (SI 2011/1843)
- The A27 Trunk Road (A3(M) Junction 5 – A27 Tear Drop Roundabout) (Temporary Prohibition of Traffic) Order (SI 2011/1844)
- The A38 Trunk Road (Glynn Valley, Near Bodmin) (Temporary Prohibition of Traffic) Order (SI 2011/1845)
- The A46 Trunk Road (Thorpe on the Hill to Winthorpe) (Temporary Prohibition of Traffic) Order (SI 2011/1846)
- The A1 Trunk Road and the A1(M) Motorway (Scotch Corner Interchange to Junction 56) (Temporary Restriction and Prohibition of Traffic) Order (SI 2011/1847)
- The Defence and Security Public Contracts Regulations (SI 2011/1848)
- The Extraction Solvents in Food (Amendment) (Wales) Regulations (SI 2011/1849)
- The M4 Motorway (Westbound Entry Slip Road at Junction 32 (Coryton), Cardiff) (Temporary Prohibition of Vehicles) Order (SI 2011/1850)
- The M62 Motorway (Junction 24 to Junction 23) (Temporary Restriction and Prohibition of Traffic) Order (SI 2011/1851)
- The M62 Motorway (Junction 37 to Junction 38) (Temporary Restriction and Prohibition of Traffic) Order (SI 2011/1852)
- The M18 Motorway (Junction 3, St Catherines) (Temporary Prohibition of Traffic) (No.2) Order (SI 2011/1853)
- The Motor Cycles Etc. (Replacement of Catalytic Converters) and Motor Vehicles (Replacement of Catalytic Converters and Pollution Control Devices) (Amendment) Regulations (SI 2011/1854)
- The M1 and M69 Motorways and the A46 Trunk Road (M1 Junction 21 to Junction 22) (Temporary Restriction and Prohibition of Traffic) Order (SI 2011/1855)
- The Statutory Auditors and Third Country Auditors (Amendment) Regulations (SI 2011/1856)
- The A49 Trunk Road (Church Stretton to Bayston Hill, Shropshire) (Temporary Prohibition of Traffic) Order (SI 2011/1857)
- The A52 Trunk Road (Spondon to M1 Junction 25, Derbyshire) (Temporary Prohibition of Traffic) Order (SI 2011/1858)
- The A50 Trunk Road (Junction with the A6, Aston-on-Trent, Derbyshire) (Link Road) (Temporary Prohibition of Traffic) Order (SI 2011/1859)
- The Railways and Other Guided Transport Systems (Safety) (Amendment) Regulations (SI 2011/1860)
- The A14 Trunk Road (Thrapston to Rothwell, Northamptonshire) (Temporary Prohibition of Traffic) Order (SI 2011/1861)
- The M4 Motorway (Junction 15 Westbound Entry Slip Road) (Temporary Prohibition of Traffic) Order (SI 2011/1862)
- The Housing and Regeneration Act 2008 (Commencement 2) (Wales) Order (SI 2011/1863)
- The Housing (Service Charge Loans) (Amendment) (Wales) Regulations (SI 2011/1864)
- The Housing (Purchase of Equitable Interests) (Wales) Regulations (SI 2011/1865)
- The Dentists Act 1984 (Medical Authorities) Order (SI 2011/1866)
- The Corporate Manslaughter and Corporate Homicide Act 2007 (Commencement 3) Order (SI 2011/1867)
- The Corporate Manslaughter and Corporate Homicide Act 2007 (Amendment) Order (SI 2011/1868)
- The M5 Motorway (Junction 29) and A30 Trunk Road (Temporary Prohibition and Restriction of Traffic) Order (SI 2011/1869)
- The M5 and M6 Motorways (M6 Junction 8) (Link Road) (Temporary Prohibition of Traffic) Order (SI 2011/1870)
- The A45 Trunk Road (Festival Roundabout, Coventry) (Slip Road) (Temporary Prohibition of Traffic) Order (SI 2011/1871)
- The M6 Motorway (Junction 31A, Southbound Entry Slip Road) (Temporary Prohibition of Traffic) Order (SI 2011/1872)
- The M4 Motorway (Junction 19 Westbound Entry Slip Road) (Temporary Prohibition of Traffic) (No 2) Order (SI 2011/1873)
- The A1 Trunk Road (Dunston Interchange to Metro Centre Interchange) (Temporary Prohibition of Traffic) Order (SI 2011/1874)
- The A1 Trunk Road (Seaton Burn to Warreners House) (Temporary Restriction and Prohibition of Traffic) Order (SI 2011/1875)
- The A55 Trunk Road (Westbound Carriageway between Junction 23 and Junction 20, Conwy County Borough) (Temporary Traffic Restriction & Prohibitions) Order (SI 2011/1876)
- The Air Navigation (Restriction of Flying) (Scottish Royal Wedding) Regulations (SI 2011/1877)
- The A1 Trunk Road (Baldersby Interchange) to the A1(M) Motorway (Junction 49, Dishforth) (Temporary Prohibition of Traffic) Order 2009 (Revocation) Order (SI 2011/1878)
- The A1 Trunk Road (Redhouse Interchange) (Temporary Prohibition of Traffic) Order (SI 2011/1879)
- The A63 Trunk Road (Mount Pleasant Interchange to Garrison Road Roundabout) (Temporary Prohibition of Traffic) Order (SI 2011/1880)
- The Toys (Safety) Regulations (SI 2011/1881)
- The A47 Trunk Road (Soke Parkway Junction 19 Fulbridge Road Interchange to Junction 20 Paston Parkway Interchange, Peterborough) Eastbound (Temporary Restriction and Prohibition of Traffic) Order (SI 2011/1882)
- The A46 Trunk Road (West of Stratford-upon-Avon, Warwickshire) (Temporary Restriction and Prohibition of Traffic) (No.2) Order (SI 2011/1883)
- The M606 Motorway (Junction 1 to Junction 3) (Temporary Prohibition of Traffic) Order (SI 2011/1884)
- The Carriage of Dangerous Goods and Use of Transportable Pressure Equipment (Amendment) Regulations (SI 2011/1885)
- The M62 Motorway (Junction 28, Junction 31 and Junction 32) (Temporary Prohibition of Traffic) Order (SI 2011/1886)
- The M42 and M5 Motorways (M5 Junction 4a) (Link Road) (Temporary Prohibition of Traffic) Order (SI 2011/1887)
- The M42 Motorway (Junction 9, Near Curdworth, Warwickshire) (Slip Road) (Temporary Prohibition of Traffic) Order (SI 2011/1888)
- The M50 Motorway (Junction 1) (Slip Roads) (Temporary Prohibition of Traffic) Order (SI 2011/1889)
- The M54 Motorway (Junctions 3 to 2) (Temporary Prohibition of Traffic) Order (SI 2011/1890)
- The A500 Trunk Road (Talke Roundabout, Staffordshire) (Temporary Prohibition of Traffic) Order (SI 2011/1891)
- The A500 Trunk Road (Tunstall Interchange, Staffordshire) (Slip Road) (Temporary Prohibition of Traffic) Order (SI 2011/1892)
- The Afghanistan (Asset-Freezing) Regulations (SI 2011/1893)
- The A5148 Trunk Road (A38/A5148 Interchange, Swinfen, Staffordshire) (Temporary Prohibition of Traffic) Order (SI 2011/1894)
- The A46 Trunk Road (Junction with the A452, near Kenilworth, Warwickshire) (Temporary Restriction and Prohibition of Traffic) Order (SI 2011/1895)
- The A5 Trunk Road (Oswestry to Shrewsbury) and the A458 Trunk Road (Shrewsbury to Plas-y-Court) (Temporary Restriction and Prohibition of Traffic) Order (SI 2011/1896)
- The A27 Trunk Road (Old Shoreham Road and Shoreham Bypass) (Temporary Restriction and Prohibition of Traffic) Order (SI 2011/1897)
- The A34 Trunk Road (Marcham Interchange, Southbound Entry Slip Road) (Temporary Prohibition of Traffic) Order (SI 2011/1898)
- The A13 Trunk Road (Near Grays) (Temporary 50 Miles Per Hour Speed Restriction) Order (SI 2011/1899)
- The A3 Trunk Road (Surrey, Cycle Race – Esher Common Junction) (Temporary Prohibition of Traffic) Order (SI 2011/1900)

== 1901–2000 ==
- The A14 Trunk Road (Junction 51 Beacon Hill Interchange to East of Pesthouse Lane Overbridge Barham, Ipswich, Suffolk) (Temporary Restriction and Prohibition of Traffic) Order (SI 2011/1901)
- The A11 Trunk Road (A1075 Thetford Road Roundabout, Kilverstone to B1111 Watton Road, Larling, Norfolk) Northbound (Temporary Prohibition of Traffic) Order (SI 2011/1902)
- The Morpeth School, Oaklands School and Swanlea School Order (SI 2011/1903)
- The A47 Trunk Road (B198 Redmoor Lane Roundabout to A1101 Wisbech Roundabout, Wisbech, Cambridgeshire) (Temporary Restriction and Prohibition of Traffic) Order (SI 2011/1904)
- The M56 Motorway (Junction 5 Eastbound Exit and Westbound Entry Slip Roads) (Temporary Prohibition of Traffic) Order (SI 2011/1905)
- The A30 Trunk Road (Liftondown Junction, Near Launceston) (Temporary Prohibition of Traffic) Order (SI 2011/1906)
- The A69 Trunk Road (West Denton Interchange to Throckley Interchange) (Temporary Prohibition of Traffic) Order (SI 2011/1907)
- The M42 Motorway (Junctions 5 to 4) (Temporary Prohibition of Traffic) Order (SI 2011/1908)
- The M42 Motorway (Junction 3a) (Link Road) (Temporary Prohibition of Traffic) ( 2) Order (SI 2011/1909)
- The Air Navigation (Restriction of Flying) (London Remembrance Events) Regulations (SI 2011/1910)
- The M5 Motorway (Junctions 24–25) (Temporary Prohibition of Traffic) Order (SI 2011/1911)
- The A38 Trunk Road (Plymouth Parkway, Devon) (Temporary Prohibition and Restriction of Traffic) Order (SI 2011/1912)
- The A590 Trunk Road (Fiddler Hall Drainage Scheme) (Temporary Prohibition and Restriction of Traffic) Order (SI 2011/1913)
- The M4 Motorway (Junction 47, Penllergaer, Swansea) (Temporary Prohibition of Vehicles) Order (SI 2011/1914)
- The A50 Trunk Road (Junction with Lightwood Road, Longton, Stoke-on-Trent) (Slip Road) (Temporary Prohibition of Traffic) Order (SI 2011/1915)
- The A38 Trunk Road (Smithaleigh Junction, Plympton Bypass) (Temporary Prohibition of Traffic) Order (SI 2011/1916)
- The School Teachers’ Pay and Conditions Order (SI 2011/1917)
- The A14 Trunk Road (Junction 7) (Kettering, Northamptonshire) (Slip Road) (Temporary Prohibition of Traffic) Order (SI 2011/1918)
- The M56 Motorway (Junctions 1- 6 Westbound and Eastbound Carriageways and Slip Roads) (Temporary Prohibition and Restriction of Traffic) Order (SI 2011/1919)
- The A590 Trunk Road (Lightburn Road, Ulverston) (Temporary Prohibition and Restriction of Traffic) Order (SI 2011/1920)
- The M18 Motorway (Thurcroft Interchange) and the M1 Motorway (Junction 32) (Temporary Restriction and Prohibition of Traffic) Order (SI 2011/1921)
- The M42 Motorway (Junction 7a) (Link Road) (Temporary Prohibition of Traffic) ( 2) Order (SI 2011/1922)
- The A11 Trunk Road (A14 Junction 38 Waterhall Interchange, Cambridgeshire to B1085 Red Lodge Interchange (North), Suffolk) (Temporary Restriction and Prohibition of Traffic) Order (SI 2011/1923)
- The A47 Trunk Road (A1065 Castle Acre Road to Lynn Road, Swaffham, Norfolk) (Temporary Restriction and Prohibition of Traffic) Order (SI 2011/1924)
- The A47 Trunk Road (A141 Guyhirn Roundabout to B198 Redmoor Lane Roundabout, Wisbech, Cambridgeshire) (Temporary Prohibition of Traffic) (No 2) Order (SI 2011/1925)
- The A5 Trunk Road (A422 Monks Way to A509 Portway, Milton Keynes) (Temporary Prohibition of Traffic) Order (SI 2011/1926)
- The A1 Trunk Road (Water Newton, City of Peterborough) Northbound (Temporary 50 Miles Per Hour Speed Restriction) Order (SI 2011/1927)
- The M1 Motorway (Junction 9, Hertfordshire to Junction 14, Milton Keynes) (Temporary Restriction and Prohibition of Traffic) Variation Order (SI 2011/1928)
- The M25 and M3 Motorways (M25 Junctions 7 – 12 and M3 Junction 1) (Temporary Prohibition of Traffic) Order (SI 2011/1929)
- The M27 Motorway (Junctions 3 and 5) (Temporary Prohibition of Traffic) Order (SI 2011/1930)
- The A3 Trunk Road (Hindhead Tunnel) (Temporary Restriction and Prohibition of Traffic) Order (SI 2011/1931)
- The A259 Trunk Road (Brookland) (Temporary Restriction and Prohibition of Traffic) Order (SI 2011/1932)
- The A3 Trunk Road (Esher Common Junction – Wisley Interchange, Southbound) (Temporary Prohibition of Traffic) Order (SI 2011/1933)
- The A34 Trunk Road (Marcham Interchange, Northbound Exit Slip Road) (Temporary Prohibition of Traffic) Order (SI 2011/1934)
- The A27 Trunk Road (Beddingham Roundabout – Polegate) (Temporary Prohibition of Traffic) Order (SI 2011/1935)
- The A3(M) Motorway (Junction 4, Southbound Entry Slip Road) (Temporary Prohibition of Traffic) Order (SI 2011/1936)
- The National Curriculum (Amendments to the Key Stage 2 and Key Stage 3 Assessment Arrangements) (Wales) Order (SI 2011/1937)
- The Terrorism Act 2000 (Designated Ports) Order (SI 2011/1938)
- The School Governors' Annual Reports (Wales) Regulations (SI 2011/1939)
- The National Health Service (Travelling Expenses and Remission of Charges) (Wales) (Amendment) (No.2) Regulations (SI 2011/1940)
- The Agency Workers (Amendment) Regulations (SI 2011/1941)
- The Pupil Information (Wales) Regulations (SI 2011/1942)
- The Head Teacher's Report to Parents and Adult Pupils (Wales) Regulations (SI 2011/1943)
- The School Information (Wales) Regulations (SI 2011/1944)
- The School Performance and Absence Targets (Wales) Regulations (SI 2011/1945)
- The Road Vehicles (Approval) (Amendment) Regulations (SI 2011/1946)
- The National Curriculum (Assessment Arrangements on Entry to the Foundation Phase) (Wales) Order (SI 2011/1947)
- The National Curriculum (End of Foundation Phase Assessment Arrangements and Revocation of the First Key Stage Assessment Arrangements) (Wales) Order (SI 2011/1948)
- The A1 Trunk Road (North Charlton) (Temporary Restriction and Prohibition of Traffic) Order (SI 2011/1949)
- The A1 Trunk Road (Barton to Scotch Corner) (Temporary Restriction and Prohibition of Traffic) Order (SI 2011/1950)
- The Education (Wales) Measure 2009 (Commencement No.2) Order (SI 2011/1951)
- The Education Act 2002 (Commencement 14) (Wales) Order (SI 2011/1952)
- The Grant for Research and Development (Transfer of Contracts etc.) Order (SI 2011/1953)
- The Changing of School Session Times (England) (Revocation) Regulations (SI 2011/1954)
- The M6 Motorway Junction 32 (Northbound Link Road to the M55 Westbound) and the M55 (Junction 1 Westbound Carriageway and Entry Slip Road) (Temporary Prohibition of Traffic) Order (SI 2011/1955)
- The Traffic Management (London Borough of Greenwich) Permit Scheme Order (SI 2011/1956)
- The Traffic Management (London Borough of Southwark) Permit Scheme Order (SI 2011/1957)
- The Traffic Management (London Borough of Lambeth) Permit Scheme Order (SI 2011/1958)
- The Traffic Management (London Borough of Waltham Forest) Permit Scheme Order (SI 2011/1959)
- The Traffic Management (London Borough of Richmond upon Thames) Permit Scheme Order (SI 2011/1960)
- The Traffic Management (London Borough of Harrow) Permit Scheme Order (SI 2011/1961)
- The Traffic Management (London Borough of Newham) Permit Scheme Order (SI 2011/1962)
- The School Performance Information (Wales) Regulations (SI 2011/1963)
- The M1 Motorway (Junction 39) (Temporary Prohibition of Traffic) Order (SI 2011/1964)
- The A1 Trunk Road (Kenton Bar Interchange to Denton Burn Interchange) (Temporary Restriction and Prohibition of Traffic) ( 3) Order (SI 2011/1965)
- The A1 Trunk Road (Eighton Lodge Interchange to Coalhouse Interchange) (Temporary Prohibition of Traffic) ( 2) Order (SI 2011/1966)
- The A1 Trunk Road (Seaton Burn Interchange to North Brunton Interchange) (Temporary Restriction and Prohibition of Traffic) Order (SI 2011/1967)
- The A1 Trunk Road (Adderstone to Belford) (Temporary Restriction and Prohibition of Traffic) Order (SI 2011/1968)
- The A23 Trunk Road and the M23 Motorway (London Road North/Brighton Road, Hooley and Merstham Interchange) (Temporary Restriction and Prohibition of Traffic) Order (SI 2011/1969)
- The M25 and the M4 Motorways (Thorney Interchange) (Temporary Prohibition of Traffic) Order (SI 2011/1970)
- The A34 Trunk Road (Bullington Cross – Kings Worthy) (Temporary Prohibition of Traffic) Order (SI 2011/1971)
- The A27 Trunk Road (Crockhurst Hill) (Temporary Prohibition of Traffic) Order (SI 2011/1972)
- The A282 Trunk Road (Junctions 1A – 2) (Temporary Prohibition of Traffic) Order (SI 2011/1973)
- The M25 Motorway (Junction 27, Clockwise) (Temporary Prohibition of Traffic) Order (SI 2011/1974)
- The A27 Trunk Road (Cop Hall Roundabout – Pevensey Bypass Roundabout) (Temporary Restriction and Prohibition of Traffic) Order (SI 2011/1975)
- The A31 Trunk Road and the M27 Motorway (M27 Junction 1 – Ashley Heath Interchange, Westbound) (Temporary Prohibition of Traffic) Order (SI 2011/1976)
- The M5 Motorway (Junctions 18 & 18A Slip Roads) (Temporary Prohibition and Restriction of Traffic) Order (No 2) (SI 2011/1977)
- The Education (Student Fees, Awards and Support) (Wales) Regulations (SI 2011/1978)
- The Civil Procedure (Amendment No.2) Rules (SI 2011/1979)
- Prohibition and Restriction of Traffic) Order (No 2) 2011 Entry Slip Road (Temporary Prohibition of Traffic) Order (SI 2011/1980)
- The A1(M) Motorway (Junctions 6 to 7, Hertfordshire) Northbound (Temporary Prohibition of Traffic) Order (SI 2011/1981)
- The M56 Motorway (Junctions 9–10) and the M6 Motorway (Junctions 20–21) Carriageway, Link and Slip Roads (Temporary Prohibition of Traffic) Order (SI 2011/1982)
- The M32 Motorway (Junctions 2 and 3 Slip Roads) (Temporary Prohibition of Traffic) (No 2) Order (SI 2011/1983)
- The European Union Act 2011 (Commencement 1) Order (SI 2011/1984)
- The European Union Act 2011 (Commencement 2) Order (SI 2011/1985)
- The Education (Student Support) Regulations (SI 2011/1986)
- The Education (Fees and Awards) (England) Regulations 2007 (Amendment) Regulations (SI 2011/1987)
- The Cockles and Mussels (Specified Area) (Wales) Order (SI 2011/1988)
- The M4 Motorway and the A470 Trunk Road (Junction 32, Coryton, Cardiff) (Temporary Traffic Restrictions and Prohibitions) Order (SI 2011/1989)
- The A30 Trunk Road (Plusha to Kennards House, Near Launceston) (Temporary Prohibition and Restriction of Traffic) Order (SI 2011/1990)
- The A38 Trunk Road (Liskeard, Cornwall) (Temporary Prohibition and Restriction of Traffic) Order (SI 2011/1991)
- The A36 Trunk Road (Steeple Langford to Stapleford) (Temporary Restriction of Traffic) Order (SI 2011/1992)
- The M5 Motorway (Junctions 5 to 6) (Temporary Restriction and Prohibition of Traffic) Order (SI 2011/1993)
- The M6 Motorway (Junction 12), the M54 Motorway (Junctions 2 – 4), the A5 Trunk Road and the A449 Trunk Road (Temporary Prohibition of Traffic) Order (SI 2011/1994)
- The A46 Trunk Road (Coventry Eastern Bypass) (Temporary Prohibition of Traffic) Order (SI 2011/1995)
- The Diocese of Bristol (Educational Endowments) (Colerne Church of England School) Order (SI 2011/1996)
- The M42 Motorway (Junction 4) (Slip Roads) (Temporary Prohibition of Traffic) Order (SI 2011/1997)
- The A45 Trunk Road (M42 Junction 6 to Stonebridge Roundabout) (Temporary Prohibition of Traffic) Order (SI 2011/1998)
- The M42 Motorway (Junctions 10 to 11) (Temporary Prohibition of Traffic) Order (SI 2011/1999)
- The A500 Trunk Road (Queensway, Stoke-on-Trent, Staffordshire) (Temporary Prohibition of Traffic) Order (SI 2011/2000)

== 2001–2100 ==
- The A38 Trunk Road (Little Eaton to M1 Junction 28, Derbyshire) (Temporary Prohibition of Traffic) Order (SI 2011/2001)
- The Riot (Damages) (Amendment) Regulations (SI 2011/2002)
- The A50 Trunk Road (Junction with the A6, Aston-on-Trent, Derbyshire) (Temporary Prohibition of Traffic) Order (SI 2011/2003)
- The A1 Trunk Road (Ranby, Nottinghamshire) (Temporary Prohibition of Traffic) Order (SI 2011/2004)
- The A49 Trunk Road (Craven Arms to Bayston Hill, Shropshire) (Temporary Restriction and Prohibition of Traffic) Order (SI 2011/2005)
- The M42 Motorway (Junction 2) (Northbound Entry Slip Road) (Temporary Prohibition of Traffic) Order (SI 2011/2006)
- The Staffordshire and Stoke-on-Trent Partnership National Health Service Trust (Establishment) Order (SI 2011/2007)
- The Architects (Recognition of European Qualifications) Regulations (SI 2011/2008)
- The Riot (Damages) (Amendment 2) Regulations (SI 2011/2009)
- The Export Control (Belarus) and (Syria Amendment) Order (SI 2011/2010)
- The Local Government (Wales) Measure 2011 (Commencement 1) Order (SI 2011/2011)
- The M621 Motorway (Junction 1 to Junction 5 and Gildersome Interchange) (Temporary Prohibition of Traffic) Order (SI 2011/2012)
- The M62 Motorway (Junction 36 to Junction 37) (Temporary Restriction and Prohibition of Traffic) Order (SI 2011/2013)
- The M180 Motorway (Junction 3 to Junction 5) (Temporary Prohibition of Traffic) Order (SI 2011/2014)
- The Wildlife and Countryside Act 1981 (Variation of Schedules 5 and 8) (England and Wales) Order (SI 2011/2015)
- The Air Navigation (Restriction of Flying) (West Wales Airport) (Revocation) Regulations (SI 2011/2016)
- The A1 Trunk Road (Cheswick to Scremeston Roundabout) (Temporary Restriction and Prohibition of Traffic) Order (SI 2011/2017)
- The A1 Trunk Road (Scremeston Roundabout to East Ord Roundabout) (Temporary Restriction and Prohibition of Traffic) Order (SI 2011/2018)
- The Access to the Countryside (Appeals against Works Notices) (England) Regulations (SI 2011/2019)
- The Access to the Countryside (Dedication of Land) (Amendment) (England) Regulations (SI 2011/2020)
- The Access to the Countryside (Exclusions and Restrictions) (Amendment) (England) Regulations (SI 2011/2021)
- The M55 Motorway (Junction 3 Eastbound Entry Slip Road) (Temporary Prohibition of Traffic) Order (SI 2011/2022)
- The M1 and M6 Motorways (M1 Junction 19) (Temporary Restriction and Prohibition of Traffic) Order (SI 2011/2023)
- The M1 Motorway (South of Northampton) (Temporary Restriction and Prohibition of Traffic) Order (SI 2011/2024)
- The A50 Trunk Road (Junction with the A522, Uttoxeter, Staffordshire) (Eastbound Entry Slip Road) (Temporary Prohibition of Traffic) Order (SI 2011/2025)
- The A43 Trunk Road (Silverstone, Northamptonshire) (Temporary 50 Miles Per Hour Speed Restriction) (No.2) Order (SI 2011/2026)
- The A23 Trunk Road (Airport Way, Gatwick Airport) (50 Miles Per Hour Speed Limit) Order (SI 2011/2027)
- The A2070 Trunk Road (Warehorne – Brenzett) (Temporary Restriction and Prohibition of Traffic) Order (SI 2011/2028)
- The A259 Trunk Road (Pevensey Levels) (Temporary Prohibition of Traffic) Order (SI 2011/2029)
- The A1(M) Motorway (Junction 6, Southbound Entry Slip Road) (Temporary Prohibition of Traffic) Order (SI 2011/2030)
- The M27 Motorway (Junctions 2 – 3) (Temporary Restriction and Prohibition of Traffic) Order (SI 2011/2031)
- The A259 Trunk Road (West of Crutches Farm – Monks Walk) (Temporary Restriction and Prohibition of Traffic) Order (SI 2011/2032)
- The M3 Motorway (Junction 6) (Temporary Restriction and Prohibition of Traffic) ( 3) Order (SI 2011/2033)
- The A20 Trunk Road and the M20 Motorway (Cheriton Interchange – Courtwood Interchange) (Temporary Restriction and Prohibition of Traffic) Order (SI 2011/2034)
- The M23 Motorway (Junction 9) (Temporary Restriction and Prohibition of Traffic) Order (SI 2011/2035)
- The A34 Trunk Road (Botley Interchange, Southbound Exit Slip Road) (Temporary Prohibition of Traffic) Order (SI 2011/2036)
- The A1 Trunk Road (Wyboston Lakes Junction and Southoe) (Temporary Prohibition of Traffic) Order (SI 2011/2037)
- The Legal Services Act 2007 (Designation as a Licensing Authority) Order (SI 2011/2038)
- The A11 Trunk Road (Wymondham Bypass, B1172 Spooner Row to B1135 Tuttles Lane, Norfolk) (Temporary Restriction and Prohibition of Traffic) Order (SI 2011/2039)
- The A30 Trunk Road (Peamore Layby, South of Alphington, Devon) (Layby Closure) Order (SI 2011/2040)
- The A30 and A38 Trunk Roads (Carminow Cross, Bodmin) (Temporary Prohibition of Traffic and Speed Restriction) Order (SI 2011/2041)
- The A26 Trunk Road (Southease Railway Station – Tarring Neville) (Temporary Prohibition of Traffic) Order (SI 2011/2042)
- The Environmental Permitting (England and Wales) (Amendment) Regulations (SI 2011/2043)
- The M62 Motorway (Junction 25 to Junction 30) (Temporary Restriction and Prohibition of Traffic) Order (SI 2011/2044)
- The M6 Motorway (Junctions 24–29 Northbound and Southbound Carriageways and Slip Roads) (Temporary Prohibition and Restriction of Traffic) Order (SI 2011/2045)
- The Diocese of Coventry (Educational Endowments) (Napton Church of England School) Order (SI 2011/2046)
- The A1 Trunk Road (Metro Centre Interchange to Dunston Interchange) (Temporary Prohibition of Traffic) Order (SI 2011/2047)
- The A184 Trunk Road (White Mare Pool Interchange to Testos Roundabout) and the A19 Trunk Road (Temporary Restriction and Prohibition of Traffic and Pedestrians) Order (SI 2011/2048)
- The A1 Trunk Road (Tritlington to Felton) (Temporary Restriction and Prohibition of Traffic) Order (SI 2011/2049)
- The A46 Trunk Road (Junction with the A429, Warwickshire) (Southbound Exit Slip Road) (Temporary Prohibition of Traffic) Order (SI 2011/2050)
- The A45 Trunk Road (Wellingborough to Raunds, Northamptonshire) (Temporary Restriction and Prohibition of Traffic) Order (SI 2011/2051)
- The Patents (Amendment) Rules (SI 2011/2052)
- The Public Procurement (Miscellaneous Amendments) Regulations (SI 2011/2053)
- The Planning Act 2008 (Commencement 7) Order (SI 2011/2054)
- The Infrastructure Planning (Changes to, and Revocation of, Development Consent Orders) Regulations (SI 2011/2055)
- The Town and Country Planning (General Permitted Development) (Amendment) (England) Order (SI 2011/2056)
- The Town and Country Planning (Control of Advertisements) (England) (Amendment) Regulations (SI 2011/2057)
- The Town and Country Planning (Compensation) (England) Regulations (SI 2011/2058)
- The Patents Act 1977 (Amendment) Regulations (SI 2011/2059)
- The A5 Trunk Road (Kilsby to Atherstone) (Temporary Restriction and Prohibition of Traffic) Order (SI 2011/2060)
- The M6 Motorway (Junctions 14 to 13) (Temporary Prohibition of Traffic) Order (SI 2011/2061)
- The A46 Trunk Road (Evesham Bypass, Worcestershire) (Temporary Prohibition of Traffic) Order (SI 2011/2062)
- The A5 Trunk Road and the M54 Motorway (Shrewsbury to Telford) (Temporary Prohibition of Traffic) Order (SI 2011/2063)
- The Allocation and Transfer of Proceedings (Amendment 2) Order (SI 2011/2064)
- The Criminal Defence Service (Funding) (Amendment) Order (SI 2011/2065)
- The Community Legal Service (Funding) (Amendment No.2) Order (SI 2011/2066)
- The Air Navigation (Restriction of Flying) (Shoreham-by-Sea) (Amendment) Regulations (SI 2011/2067)
- The A64 Trunk Road (Askham Bryan) (Temporary Prohibition of Traffic) ( 2) Order (SI 2011/2068)
- The A5111, A52 and A6 Trunk Roads (Alvaston, Derby) (Temporary Prohibition of Traffic) Order (SI 2011/2069)
- The A66 Trunk Road (Slapestones Roundabout to Baron's Cross Resurfacing) (Temporary Restriction and Prohibition of Traffic) Order (SI 2011/2070)
- The M6 Motorway (Junctions 35–34, Southbound Carriageway) (Temporary Restriction of Traffic) Order (SI 2011/2071)
- The M20 Motorway (Junctions 4 – 6) (Temporary Restriction and Prohibition of Traffic) Order (SI 2011/2072)
- The A26 Trunk Road (New Road, Newhaven) (Waiting Restrictions) Order (SI 2011/2073)
- The M1 Motorway and the A405 Trunk Road (North Orbital Road – M1 Junction 6) (Temporary Restriction and Prohibition of Traffic) Order (SI 2011/2074)
- The A27 Trunk Road (Portfield Roundabout) (Temporary Speed Restrictions) Order (SI 2011/2075)
- The M1 Motorway (Junctions 2 – 4) (Temporary Restriction of Traffic) Order (SI 2011/2076)
- The A27 Trunk Road (East of Clapham Interchange) (Temporary Restriction and Prohibition of Traffic) Order (SI 2011/2077)
- The A2 Trunk Road (Ebbsfleet Junction) (Temporary Restriction and Prohibition of Traffic) Order (SI 2011/2078)
- The A47 Trunk Road (Postwick Interchange, Norwich, Norfolk) (Temporary 50 Miles Per Hour Speed Restriction) Order (SI 2011/2079)
- The A14 Trunk Road (Junction 23 Spittals Interchange to Junction 36 Nine Mile Hill, Cambridgeshire) and M11 Motorway (Junction 13 to A14) (Temporary Prohibition of Traffic) Order (SI 2011/2080)
- The A12 and A120 Trunk Roads (South of Junction 29 Crown Interchange, Colchester, Essex to South of Wenham Magna, Suffolk) (Temporary Restriction and Prohibition of Traffic) Order (SI 2011/2081)
- The A483 Trunk Road (Llandybie, Carmarthenshire) (Temporary 10 mph Speed Limit & No Overtaking) Order (SI 2011/2082)
- The A465 Trunk Road (Cefn Coed Roundabout, Merthyr Tydfil to Hirwaun Roundabout, Rhondda Cynon Taf) (Temporary Prohibition of Vehicles & 50 mph Speed Limit) Order (SI 2011/2083)
- The Wireless Telegraphy (Fixed Penalty) Regulations (SI 2011/2084)
- The Postal Services Act 2011 (Consequential Modifications and Amendments) Order (SI 2011/2085)
- The A55 Trunk Road (Slip Roads between Junction 2 (Ty^ Mawr) and Junction 6 (Nant Turnpike), Isle of Anglesey) (Temporary Prohibition of Vehicles) Order (SI 2011/2086)
- The A5 Trunk Road (A4146 Kelly's Kitchen to A422 Monks Way, Milton Keynes) (Temporary Prohibition of Traffic) Order (SI 2011/2087)
- The A180 Trunk Road (Brocklesby Interchange to Barnetby Interchange) and the A160 Trunk Road (Temporary Restriction and Prohibition of Traffic) Order (SI 2011/2088)
- The A12 Trunk Road (South of Junction 32a Capel St. Mary Interchange to North of Junction 30 Stratford St. Mary Interchange, Suffolk) (Temporary Restriction and Prohibition of Traffic) Order (SI 2011/2089)
- The A168 Trunk Road (York Road Interchange to Dishforth Interchange) (Temporary Restriction and Prohibition of Traffic) Order (SI 2011/2090)
- The A414 Trunk Road (M1 Motorway Junction 8 to A5183/A405 Park Street Roundabout St Albans, Hertfordshire) (Temporary Prohibition of Traffic) Order (SI 2011/2091)
- The A14 Trunk Road (Junction 52 Claydon Interchange, Ipswich, Suffolk) Slip Roads (Temporary Prohibition of Traffic) Order (SI 2011/2092)
- The A1 Trunk Road (Carpenter's Lodge to Stamford) (Temporary Restriction and Prohibition of Traffic) Order (SI 2011/2093)
- The M53 Motorway (Junction 2 Southbound Exit Slip Road) (Moreton Spur) (Temporary Restriction of Traffic) Order (SI 2011/2094)
- The A30 Trunk Road (Avers Junction, Redruth, and Treswithian Junction, Camborne) (Temporary Restriction of Traffic) Order (No 2) (SI 2011/2095)
- The A1(M) Motorway (Junction 48 to Junction 49) (Temporary Restriction and Prohibition of Traffic) Order (SI 2011/2096)
- The Civil Courts (Amendment 3) Order (SI 2011/2097)
- The A47 Trunk Road (Longthorpe Interchange, Peterborough) Eastbound (Temporary Restriction and Prohibition of Traffic) Order (SI 2011/2098)
- The A48 Trunk Road (Cwmffrwd Junction to Llanddarog Junction, Carmarthenshire) (Temporary Traffic Restrictions and Prohibitions) Order (SI 2011/2099)
- The A483 Trunk Road (Cilyrychen Level Crossing, Llandeilo Road, Near Llandybie, Carmarthenshire) (Temporary Prohibition of Vehicles) Order (SI 2011/2100)

== 2101–2200 ==
- The A40 Trunk Road (West of Llanddewi Velfrey, Pembrokeshire) (Temporary Traffic Restrictions and Prohibition) Order (SI 2011/2101)
- The A4076 Trunk Road (Johnston, Pembrokeshire) (Temporary 10 MPH Speed Limit and Prohibition of Overtaking) Order (SI 2011/2102)
- The A4076 Trunk Road (Milford Haven, Pembrokeshire) (Temporary 10 MPH Speed Limit and Prohibition of Overtaking) Order (SI 2011/2103)
- The Air Navigation (Restriction of Flying) (Sculthorpe Airfield) Regulations (SI 2011/2104)
- The Smoke Control Areas (Authorised Fuels) (England) (Amendment) (No.2) Regulations (SI 2011/2105)
- The Smoke Control Areas (Exempted Fireplaces) (England) ( 2) Order (SI 2011/2106)
- The Designation of Schools Having a Religious Character (Independent Schools) (England) ( 4) Order (SI 2011/2107)
- The M56 Motorway (Junctions 15–16 Westbound and Eastbound Carriageways, Link and Slip Roads) and the M53 Motorway (Temporary Prohibition and Restriction of Traffic) Order (SI 2011/2108)
- The M18 Motorway and the M62 Motorway (Langham Interchange) (Temporary Restriction and Prohibition of Traffic) Order (SI 2011/2109)
- The M18 Motorway (Junction 5 and Junction 6) (Temporary Prohibition of Traffic) Order (SI 2011/2110)
- The M621 Motorway (Gildersome Interchange) (Temporary Prohibition of Traffic) (No.2) Order (SI 2011/2111)
- The A66 Trunk Road (Blands Corner Roundabout to Morton Palms Roundabout) (Temporary Restriction and Prohibition of Traffic) Order (SI 2011/2112)
- The A66 Trunk Road (Bowes Interchange to Cross Lanes Junction) (Temporary Restriction and Prohibition of Traffic) Order (SI 2011/2113)
- The A66 Trunk Road (Layby at Boathouse Lane Interchange) (Temporary Prohibition of Traffic) Order (SI 2011/2114)
- The A303 Trunk Road (Horton, Near Ilminster) (Temporary Prohibition and Restriction of Traffic) Order (SI 2011/2115)
- The M5 Motorway (Junction 27) (Temporary Prohibition and Restriction of Traffic) Order (SI 2011/2116)
- The A11 Trunk Road (B1112 Icklingham to B1106 Elveden, Suffolk) (Temporary Prohibition of Traffic) Order (SI 2011/2117)
- The M18 Motorway and the M1 Motorway (Thurcroft Interchange) (Temporary Restriction and Prohibition of Traffic) Order (SI 2011/2118)
- The A590 Trunk Road (A590/M6 Junction 36 Roundabout to Brettargh Holt Roundabout) (Temporary Prohibition and Restriction of Traffic) Order (SI 2011/2119)
- The M65 Motorway (Junctions 6–8 Eastbound and Westbound Carriageways and Junction 7 Slip Roads) (Temporary Prohibition and Restriction of Traffic) Order (SI 2011/2120)
- The A66 Trunk Road (Beckses Junction to Highgate Resurfacing) (Temporary Prohibition and Restriction of Traffic) Order (SI 2011/2121)
- The Air Navigation (Restriction of Flying) (Jet Formation Display Teams) ( 3) (Amendment) Regulations (SI 2011/2122)
- The Education (Information About Individual Pupils) (England) (Amendment) Regulations (SI 2011/2123)
- The A40 Trunk Road (Llandovery Level Crossing, Llandovery, Carmarthenshire) (Temporary Prohibition of Vehicles) Order (SI 2011/2124)
- The A38 Trunk Road (Pridhamsleigh to Lower Dean, Buckfastleigh, Devon) (Temporary Prohibition and Restriction of Traffic) Order (SI 2011/2125)
- The A1(M) Motorway (Junctions 3 — 1, Southbound) (Temporary Prohibition of Traffic) Order (SI 2011/2126)
- The M25 Motorway, the M4 Motorway and the M40 Motorway (M25 Junctions 14 – 16, M4 Junction 4B and M40 Junction 1A) (Temporary Prohibition of Traffic) Order (SI 2011/2127)
- The M23 Motorway (Junction 8 – North of Junction 9) (Temporary Restriction of Traffic) Order (SI 2011/2128)
- The A27 Trunk Road (Tangmere Roundabout – Fontwell Roundabout East) (Temporary Restriction and Prohibition of Traffic) Order (SI 2011/2129)
- The A2070 Trunk Road (Finn Farm Roundabout) (Temporary Restriction and Prohibition of Traffic) Order (SI 2011/2130)
- The Plant Protection Products Regulations (SI 2011/2131)
- The Plant Protection Products (Fees and Charges) Regulations (SI 2011/2132)
- The A3 Trunk Road (A287 Junction, Hindhead) (Temporary Prohibition of Traffic) Order (SI 2011/2133)
- The Non-Road Mobile Machinery (Emission of Gaseous and Particulate Pollutants) (Amendment) Regulations (SI 2011/2134)
- The M20 Motorway and the A20 Trunk Road (Roundhill Viaduct, Coastbound) (Temporary Restriction of Traffic) Order (SI 2011/2135)
- The National Health Service (Pharmaceutical Services) Amendment Regulations (SI 2011/2136)
- The M4 Motorway (East of Junction 15, Eastbound) (Temporary Restriction of Traffic) ( 2) Order (SI 2011/2137)
- The A1 Trunk Road and A1(M) Motorway (Alconbury to Brampton Hut Interchange, Cambridgeshire) (Temporary Prohibition of Traffic) Order (SI 2011/2138)
- The M1 Motorway (Junctions 2 – 1) (Temporary Restriction and Prohibition of Traffic) Order (SI 2011/2139)
- The M25 Motorway, the M23 Motorway and the M3 Motorway (M25 Junctions 7 – 13, Slip/Link Roads) (Temporary Restriction and Prohibition of Traffic) Order (SI 2011/2140)
- The A2 Trunk Road (West of Lydden Hill – East of Coldred Hill) (Temporary Restriction and Prohibition of Traffic) Order (SI 2011/2141)
- The M1 Motorway (Junction 10 to Junction 10a, Central Bedfordshire and the Borough of Luton) (Temporary Restriction of Traffic) Order (SI 2011/2142)
- The A47 Trunk Road (Wisbech Level Crossing, Cambridgeshire) (Temporary Prohibition of Traffic) Order (SI 2011/2143)
- The Police and Justice Act 2006 (Commencement 14) Order (SI 2011/2144)
- The A1 Trunk Road (Alwalton to Wothorpe, Peterborough) Northbound (Temporary Restriction and Prohibition of Traffic) Order (SI 2011/2145)
- The A1(M) Motorway (Letchworth Road Bridge, Hertfordshire) Northbound (Temporary Restriction of Traffic) Order (SI 2011/2146)
- The M32 Motorway (Junction 1 Northbound Entry Slip Road) (Temporary Prohibition of Traffic) Order (SI 2011/2147)
- The Coroners and Justice Act 2009 (Commencement 8) Order (SI 2011/2148)
- The A63 Trunk Road (Mytongate Gyratory to Market Place) (Temporary 30 Miles Per Hour Speed Restriction) Order (SI 2011/2149)
- The M4 Motorway (Junction 17 Westbound Exit Slip Road) (Temporary Prohibition of Traffic) Order (SI 2011/2150)
- The M5 Motorway (Junction 19 Slip Roads) (Temporary Prohibition and Restriction of Traffic) Order (SI 2011/2151)
- The A30 Trunk Road (Bodmin Bypass) (Temporary Restriction of Traffic) Order (SI 2011/2152)
- The A303 Trunk Road (South Petherton, Somerset) (Temporary Prohibition and Restriction of Traffic) Order (SI 2011/2153)
- The Pigs (Records, Identification and Movement) Order (SI 2011/2154)
- The A30 Trunk Road (Okehampton) (Temporary Prohibition and Restriction of Traffic) Order (SI 2011/2155)
- The Private Security Industry Act 2001 (Licences) Regulations 2007 (Amendment) Regulations (SI 2011/2156)
- The Supply of Machinery (Safety) (Amendment) Regulations (SI 2011/2157)
- The A38 Trunk Road (Drybridge Junction to Marley Head Junction, Near South Brent) (Temporary Prohibition and Restriction of Traffic) Order (SI 2011/2158)
- The Veterinary Medicines Regulations (SI 2011/2159)
- The A1 Trunk Road (Elkesley, Nottinghamshire) (Temporary Prohibition of Traffic) Order (SI 2011/2160)
- The M6 Motorway (Junction 3) (Slip Roads) (Temporary Prohibition of Traffic) Order (SI 2011/2161)
- The M6 Motorway (Junction 6, Gravelly Hill) (Slip Road) (Temporary Prohibition of Traffic) ( 3) Order (SI 2011/2162)
- The A50 Trunk Road (Heron Cross to Blythe Bridge) (Temporary Prohibition of Traffic) Order (SI 2011/2163)
- The A449 & A40 Trunk Roads (Usk to Raglan, Monmouthshire) (Temporary Traffic Restrictions & Prohibitions) Order (SI 2011/2164)
- The A40 Trunk Road (Penblewin, Narberth, Pembrokeshire) (Temporary Traffic Restrictions & Prohibition) Order (SI 2011/2165)
- The A477 Trunk Road (West of Kilgetty Roundabout, Pembrokeshire) (Temporary Traffic Restrictions & Prohibition) Order (SI 2011/2166)
- The A40 Trunk Road (Narberth Road and Fishguard Road, Haverfordwest, Pembrokeshire) (Temporary Traffic Restriction & Prohibition) Order (SI 2011/2167)
- The M4 Motorway (Ebbw River Bridge, Junction 27, High Cross to Junction 28, Tredegar Park, Newport) (Temporary Traffic Restrictions and Prohibitions) Order (SI 2011/2168)
- The A40 and A449 Trunk Roads (Over Ross Roundabout to Travellers Rest Roundabout, Herefordshire) (Temporary Restriction and Prohibition of Traffic) Order (SI 2011/2169)
- The M54 Motorway (Junction 4) (Westbound Exit Slip Road) (Temporary Prohibition of Traffic) Order (SI 2011/2170)
- The M42 Motorway (Junction 3) (Temporary Prohibition of Traffic) Order (SI 2011/2171)
- The M42 Motorway (Junction 1/A38 Roundabout) (Temporary Prohibition of Traffic) Order (SI 2011/2172)
- The M6 Motorway (Junction 8) (Temporary Prohibition of Traffic) Order (SI 2011/2173)
- The M5 Motorway (Junction 3) (Temporary 50 Miles Per Hour Speed Restriction) Order (SI 2011/2174)
- The Firearms (Amendment) Act 1988 (Amendment) Regulations (SI 2011/2175)
- The M1 Motorway (Junction 29) (Slip Road) (Temporary Prohibition of Traffic) Order (SI 2011/2176)
- The A49 Trunk Road (Leominster to Hope under Dinmore, Herefordshire) (Temporary Prohibition of Traffic) Order (SI 2011/2177)
- The M5 and M6 Motorways (M6 Junction 6 to Junction 8) (Temporary Restriction and Prohibition of Traffic) Order (SI 2011/2178)
- The A49 Trunk Road (Woofferton to Ludlow) (Temporary Restriction and Prohibition of Traffic) Order (SI 2011/2179)
- The A46 Trunk Road (Carholme Roundabout to Doddington Roundabout, Lincolnshire) (Temporary Prohibition of Traffic) Order (SI 2011/2180)
- The A19 Trunk Road (A1185 Seal Sands Roundabout) (Temporary Restriction and Prohibition of Traffic) Order (SI 2011/2181)
- The A19 Trunk Road (Killingworth Interchange) (Temporary Restriction and Prohibition of Traffic) Order (SI 2011/2182)
- The Merchant Shipping (Ship-to-Ship Transfers) (Amendment) ( 2) Regulations (SI 2011/2183)
- The Single Use Carrier Bags Charge (Wales) (Amendment) Regulations (SI 2011/2184)
- The Tonnage Tax (Training Requirement) (Amendment) Regulations (SI 2011/2185)
- The M42 Motorway (Junction 7a) (Link Road) (Temporary Prohibition of Traffic) ( 3) Order (SI 2011/2186)
- The A36 Trunk Road (Norridge Farm, Near Warminster) (Temporary Restriction of Traffic) Order (SI 2011/2187)
- The Criminal Justice Act 2003 (Commencement 26) Order (SI 2011/2188)
- The Public Guardian (Fees, etc.) (Amendment) Regulations (SI 2011/2189)
- The A64 Trunk Road (Bond Hill Interchange and Fulford Interchange) (Temporary Restriction and Prohibition of Traffic) Order (SI 2011/2190)
- The A1 Trunk Road (Birtley Interchange) (Temporary Prohibition of Traffic) ( 2) Order (SI 2011/2191)
- The Authorised Investment Funds (Tax) (Amendment 2) Regulations (SI 2011/2192)
- The Legal Services Act 2007 (Notification of Interests in Licensed Bodies) (Specified Periods) Order (SI 2011/2193)
- The Overseas Companies (Execution of Documents and Registration of Charges) (Amendment) Regulations (SI 2011/2194)
- The Renewable Heat Incentive (Amendment to the Energy Act 2008) Regulations (SI 2011/2195)
- The Legal Services Act 2007 (Commencement 11, Transitory and Transitional Provisions and Related Amendments) Order (SI 2011/2196)
- The Heysham Port Health Authority Order (SI 2011/2197)
- The Companies (Disclosure of Auditor Remuneration and Liability Limitation Agreements) (Amendment) Regulations (SI 2011/2198)
- The Misuse of Drugs (Licence Fees) (Amendment) Regulations (SI 2011/2199)
- The Health Authorities (Membership and Procedure) Amendment Regulations (SI 2011/2200)

== 2201–2300 ==
- The A66 Trunk Road (Appleby to Sandford Resurfacing) (Temporary Prohibition and Restriction of Traffic) Order (SI 2011/2201)
- The M50 Motorway (M5 Junction 8 to M50 Junction 2) (Temporary Prohibition of Traffic) (No.2) Order (SI 2011/2202)
- The Insolvency (Amendment) Regulations (SI 2011/2203)
- The Flood and Water Management Act 2010 (Commencement 4 and Transitional Provisions) Order (SI 2011/2204)
- The Stamp Duty and Stamp Duty Reserve Tax (Cassa Di Compensazione E Garanzia S.p.A.) Regulations (SI 2011/2205)
- The M62 Motorway (Junctions 9-11 Eastbound and Westbound Carriageways, Slip and Link Roads) and the M6 (Junction 21A Link Roads) (Temporary Prohibition and Restriction of Traffic) Order (SI 2011/2206)
- The A19 Trunk Road (Silverlink Roundabout to Howdon Interchange) (Temporary Restriction and Prohibition of Traffic) Order (SI 2011/2207)
- The Buying Agency Trading Fund (Amendment) Order (SI 2011/2208)
- The M57 Motorway (Junctions 1–4, Northbound and Southbound Carriageways and Slip Roads) and the M62 (Link Road) (Temporary Prohibition and Restriction of Traffic) Order (SI 2011/2209)
- The M65 Motorway (Junctions 1–3 Eastbound Carriageway and Junction 2 Slip Road) and the M61 (Junction 9 Link Road) (Temporary Prohibition and Restriction of Traffic) Order (SI 2011/2210)
- The A30 Trunk Road (Victoria Interchange, Near Bodmin) (Temporary Prohibition of Traffic) (No 2) Order (SI 2011/2211)
- The A38 Trunk Road (South Brent to Ivybridge, Devon) (Temporary Prohibition of Traffic) Order (SI 2011/2212)
- The Railway Byelaws Amendment Order (SI 2011/2213)
- The M4 Motorway (Junction 5 – West of Junction 14, Carriageways) (Temporary Restriction of Traffic) Order (SI 2011/2214)
- The A34 Trunk Road (Gore Hill, Northbound Carriageway) (Lay-By Closure and Restriction on Use of Offside Lane) Order (SI 2011/2215)
- The A11 Trunk Road (Balsham, Cambridge) (Temporary Prohibition of Traffic) Order (SI 2011/2216)
- The M11 Motorway and A120 Trunk Road (Junction 8, Birchanger Interchange, Essex) (Temporary Restriction and Prohibition of Traffic) Order (SI 2011/2217)
- The A1 Trunk Road (Eaton Ford, St Neots, Cambridgeshire) Southbound Slip Roads (Temporary Prohibition of Traffic) Order (SI 2011/2218)
- The M4 Motorway (Junctions 14 – 15) (Temporary Restriction and Prohibition of Traffic) ( 2) Order (SI 2011/2219)
- The Capital Allowances (Environmentally Beneficial Plant and Machinery) (Amendment) Order (SI 2011/2220)
- The Capital Allowances (Energy-saving Plant and Machinery) (Amendment) Order (SI 2011/2221)
- The Patents County Court (Financial Limits) ( 2) Order (SI 2011/2222)
- The East Lancashire Hospitals National Health Service Trust (Establishment) and the Blackburn, Hyndburn and Ribble Valley Health Care National Health Service Trust and Burnley Health Care National Health Service Trust (Dissolution) Amendment Order (SI 2011/2223)
- The Criminal Justice Act 2003 (New Method of Instituting Proceedings) (Public Prosecutor Specification) Order (SI 2011/2224)
- The Excise Goods (Holding, Movement and Duty Point) (Amendment) Regulations (SI 2011/2225)
- The Inheritance Tax (Delivery of Accounts) (Excepted Estates) (Amendment) ( 2) Regulations (SI 2011/2226)
- The Derelict Land Clearance Area (Highbarns, Hemel Hempstead) Order (SI 2011/2227)
- The Offshore Installations (Safety Zones) (No.3) Order (SI 2011/2228)
- The A3 Trunk Road (Hindhead Tunnel) (Temporary Restriction and Prohibition of Traffic) ( 2) Order (SI 2011/2229)
- The M2 Motorway (Harp Farm Road – Stony Lane) (Temporary Restriction and Prohibition of Traffic) Order (SI 2011/2230)
- The A1(M) Motorway (Hatfield Tunnel) (Temporary Prohibition of Traffic) ( 2) Order (SI 2011/2231)
- The A303 Trunk Road (Stockton Woods to Wylye, Wiltshire) (Temporary Prohibition and Restriction of Traffic) Order (SI 2011/2232)
- The A470 Trunk Road (Newbridge on Wye to Llangurig, Powys) (Temporary Traffic Restrictions and Prohibition) Order (SI 2011/2233)
- The M4 Motorway (Slip Roads at Junction 48, Hendy, Carmarthenshire) (Temporary Prohibition of Vehicles) Order (SI 2011/2234)
- The Air Navigation (Restriction of Flying) (Wales Rally GB) Regulations (SI 2011/2235)
- The Air Navigation (Restriction of Flying) (Jet Formation Display Teams) ( 3) (Amendment 2) Regulations (SI 2011/2236)
- The NHS Commissioning Board Authority (Establishment and Constitution) Order (SI 2011/2237)
- The M27 Motorway (Junctions 11 – 12) (Temporary Restriction and Prohibition of Traffic) Order (SI 2011/2238)
- The A30 Trunk Road (Daisymount Junction, Near Ottery St Mary, Devon) (Temporary Prohibition of Traffic) Order (SI 2011/2239)
- The M3 Motorway (Junction 5, Eastbound Entry Slip Road) (Temporary Prohibition of Traffic) Order (SI 2011/2240)
- The M2 Motorway (Junctions 4 – 5) (Temporary Prohibition of Traffic) Order (SI 2011/2241)
- The A2 Trunk Road (Jubilee Way, Coastbound Carriageway) (Temporary Prohibition of Traffic) Order (SI 2011/2242)
- The A36 Trunk Road (Woolverton to Beckington, Somerset) (Temporary Restriction of Traffic) Order (SI 2011/2243)
- The Safety of Sports Grounds (Designation) (No.3) Order (SI 2011/2244)
- The A5 Trunk Road (M1 Junction 18) (Temporary Prohibition of Traffic) Order (SI 2011/2245)
- The M60 Motorway (Junction 26 Clockwise Exit and Entry Slip Roads) (Temporary Prohibition of Traffic) Order (SI 2011/2246)
- The M53 Motorway (Junctions 6–10 Northbound and Southbound Carriageways and Slip Roads) (Temporary Prohibition and Restriction of Traffic) Order (SI 2011/2247)
- The A1 Trunk Road (Heighley Gate Junction to Earsdon Junction) (Temporary Restriction and Prohibition of Traffic) Order (SI 2011/2248)
- The A180 Trunk Road (Stallingborough Interchange to Great Coates Interchange) (Temporary Prohibition of Traffic) Order (SI 2011/2249)
- The NHS Commissioning Board Authority Regulations (SI 2011/2250)
- The A38 Trunk Road (Chudleigh, Near Newton Abbot) (Temporary Prohibition of Traffic) Order (SI 2011/2251)
- The A38 Trunk Road (Lower Dean and Kennford, Devon) (Temporary Prohibition of Traffic) Order (SI 2011/2252)
- The A30 Trunk Road (Whiddon Down, near Okehampton) (Temporary Prohibition and Restriction of Traffic) Order (SI 2011/2253)
- The A590 Trunk Road (Brettargh Holt to Levens Resurfacing) (Temporary Prohibition and Restriction of Traffic) Order (SI 2011/2254)
- The A1(M) Motorway (Junction 58 to Junction 57) (Temporary Restriction and Prohibition of Traffic) Order (SI 2011/2255)
- The M60 Motorway (Junction 9 Anticlockwise Entry and Clockwise Exit Slip Roads) (Temporary Prohibition of Traffic) Order (SI 2011/2256)
- The Superannuation (Admission to Schedule 1 to the Superannuation Act 1972) Order (SI 2011/2257)
- The A1 Trunk Road (Derwenthaugh Interchange to Scotswood Interchange) (Temporary Restriction and Prohibition of Traffic) Order (SI 2011/2258)
- The A64 Trunk Road (A1039 Staxton Roundabout) (Temporary Restriction and Prohibition of Traffic) Order (SI 2011/2259)
- The Equality Act 2010 (Specific Duties) Regulations (SI 2011/2260)
- The Air Traffic Controller Licensing (National Supervisory Authority) Regulations (SI 2011/2261)
- The Investment Bank Special Administration (Scotland) Rules (SI 2011/2262)
- The M621 Motorway (Junction 2) (Temporary Prohibition of Traffic) Order (SI 2011/2263)
- The A19 Trunk Road (Tyne Tunnel to Silverlink) (50 Miles Per Hour Speed Restriction) Order (SI 2011/2264)
- The A19 Trunk Road (Lindisfarne Interchange) (Temporary Prohibition of Traffic) Order (SI 2011/2265)
- The A419 Trunk Road (Commonhead Roundabout, Swindon, to the Spine Road Junction, near Cirencester) (Temporary Prohibition of Traffic) Order (SI 2011/2266)
- The A5 Trunk Road (Muckley Corner, Staffordshire) (Temporary Prohibition of Traffic) Order (SI 2011/2267)
- The A38 Trunk Road (Alrewas, Staffordshire) (Northbound Exit Slip Road) (Temporary Prohibition of Traffic) Order (SI 2011/2268)
- The M42 Motorway (Junctions 6 to 7) (Temporary Restriction and Prohibition of Traffic) Order (SI 2011/2269)
- The M5 Motorway (Junction 8) (Slip Road) (Temporary Prohibition of Traffic) Order (SI 2011/2270)
- The M6 Motorway (Junctions 42–41, Southbound Carriageway) (Temporary Prohibition and Restriction of Traffic) Order (SI 2011/2271)
- The A303 Trunk Road (Upper Cranbourne Farm, Access Road) (Temporary Prohibition of Traffic) Order (SI 2011/2272)
- The M4 Motorway (Junction 15 – West of Junction 14) (Temporary Restriction and Prohibition of Traffic) Order (SI 2011/2273)
- The A500 Trunk Road (M6 Junction 16 to Talke Roundabout, Staffordshire) (Temporary Prohibition of Traffic) Order (SI 2011/2274)
- The M3 Motorway (Junction 3, Eastbound Entry Slip Road) (Temporary Prohibition of Traffic) Order (SI 2011/2275)
- The A12 Trunk Road (Bascule Bridge, Lowestoft, Suffolk) (Temporary Prohibition of Traffic and Pedestrians) (No 2) Order (SI 2011/2276)
- The A66 Trunk Road (High Barn to Whinfell) (Temporary Restriction and Prohibition of Traffic) Order (SI 2011/2277)
- The M25 Motorway (Junction 8, Slip Roads) (Temporary Prohibition of Traffic) ( 2) Order (SI 2011/2278)
- The Crime and Security Act 2010 (Domestic Violence: Pilot Schemes) Order ( 2) (SI 2011/2279)
- The Finance Act 2011, Section 43 (Appointed Day) Order (SI 2011/2280)
- The Employer-Financed Retirement Benefits (Excluded Benefits for Tax Purposes) (Amendment) Regulations (SI 2011/2281)
- The Police and Criminal Evidence Act 1984 (Armed Forces) (Amendment) Order (SI 2011/2282)
- The M3 Motorway (Junction 4A, Slip Roads) (Temporary Prohibition of Traffic) Order (SI 2011/2283)
- The A2 Trunk Road (Upper Harbledown – Nackington) (Temporary Prohibition of Traffic) Order (SI 2011/2284)
- The A259 Trunk Road (Near Rye) (Temporary Prohibition of Traffic) Order (SI 2011/2285)
- The A417 Trunk Road (Burford Road Junction, Cirencester) (Temporary Prohibition of Traffic) Order (SI 2011/2286)
- The M5 Motorway (Junction 25 Slip Roads) (Temporary Prohibition of Traffic) (Number 2) Order (SI 2011/2287)
- The National Savings Bank (Amendment) ( 2) Regulations (SI 2011/2288)
- The A5 Trunk Road (Betws y Coed to Swallow Falls Hotel, Conwy) (Temporary Traffic Restrictions and Prohibition) Order (SI 2011/2289)
- The A35 Trunk Road (Charmouth Bypass, Dorset) (Temporary Prohibition and Restriction of Traffic) Order (SI 2011/2290)
- The M1 Motorway (Junction 23a) (Temporary Restriction and Prohibition of Traffic) Order (SI 2011/2291)
- The Alien and Locally Absent Species in Aquaculture (England and Wales) Regulations (SI 2011/2292)
- The A40 Trunk Road (Pontyfenni to Llanboidy Roundabout, Carmarthenshire) (Temporary Traffic Restrictions and Prohibition) Order (SI 2011/2293)
- The A42 Trunk Road and the M1 Motorway (Packington to M1 Junction 23a) (Temporary Prohibition of Traffic) Order (SI 2011/2294)
- The A45 Trunk Road (Near Thurlaston, Warwickshire) (Temporary Prohibition of Traffic) Order (SI 2011/2295)
- The Police Act 1997 (Criminal Records and Registration) (Isle of Man) Regulations (SI 2011/2296)
- The Nursing and Midwifery Council (Fees and Education, Registration and Registration Appeals) (Amendment) Rules Order of Council (SI 2011/2297)
- The Criminal Justice and Licensing (Scotland) Act 2010 (Consequential Provisions and Modifications) Order (SI 2011/2298)
- The Landfill (Maximum Landfill Amount) Regulations (SI 2011/2299)
- The M60 Motorway (Junction 3, Clockwise and Anticlockwise Exit Slip Roads to the A34 Southbound) (Temporary Prohibition of Traffic) Order (SI 2011/2300)

== 2301–2400 ==
- The M60 Motorway (Junctions 1–5 Clockwise and Anticlockwise Carriageways and Slip Roads) (Temporary Prohibition and Restriction of Traffic) Order (SI 2011/2301)
- The A55 Trunk Road (Junction 37 Northbound and Southbound Exit and Entry Slip Roads) (Temporary Prohibition of Traffic) Order (SI 2011/2302)
- The A590 Trunk Road (Barrowbanks, Newby Bridge) (Prohibition of Traffic Movements) Order (SI 2011/2303)
- The Financial Services and Markets Act 2000 (Carrying on Regulated Activities by Way of Business) (Amendment) Order (SI 2011/2304)
- The Storage of Carbon Dioxide (Access to Infrastructure) Regulations (SI 2011/2305)
- The A36 Trunk Road (Ower Roundabout to M27 Junction 2) (Temporary Prohibition of Traffic) Order (SI 2011/2306)
- The A419 Trunk Road (Honda Junction to Commonhead Roundabout, Swindon) (Temporary Prohibition of Traffic) Order (SI 2011/2307)
- The A30 Trunk Road (Alphington Junction, Exeter, to Whiddon Down Junction, Near Okehampton, Devon) (Temporary Prohibition and Restriction of Traffic) Order (SI 2011/2308)
- The A12 Trunk Road (Colchester Road, Braiswick, Essex) Northbound Lay-by (Temporary Prohibition of Traffic) Order (SI 2011/2309)
- The A465 Trunk Road (Eastbound On Slip Road at Glynneath Interchange, Neath Port Talbot) (Temporary Prohibition of Vehicles) Order (SI 2011/2310)
- The A1(M) Motorway (Junction 59 to Junction 60) (Temporary Restriction and Prohibition of Traffic) Order (SI 2011/2311)
- The A1 Trunk Road (Charlton Mires to North Charlton) (Temporary Restriction and Prohibition of Traffic) Order (SI 2011/2312)
- The A1 Trunk Road and the A1(M) Motorway (Eighton Lodge Interchange to Junction 63) and the A194(M) Motorway (Temporary Restriction and Prohibition of Traffic) Order (SI 2011/2313)
- The M62 Motorway and the A63 Trunk Road (Junction 37 to South Cave Interchange) (Temporary Restriction and Prohibition of Traffic and Pedestrians) Order (SI 2011/2314)
- The M62 Motorway (Junction 27 to Junction 28) (Temporary Prohibition of Traffic) Order (SI 2011/2315)
- The A696 Trunk Road (Kenton Bar Interchange to Black Callerton Lane Interchange) (Temporary Restriction and Prohibition of Traffic) ( 2) Order (SI 2011/2316)
- The A590 Trunk Road (Kent Bridge, Brettargh Holt) (Temporary Prohibition and Restriction of Traffic) Order (SI 2011/2317)
- The A56 Trunk Road (Northbound and Southbound Carriageways and Slip Roads) and the M66 Motorway (Northbound and Southbound) (Temporary Prohibition of Traffic) Order (SI 2011/2318)
- The M5 Motorway (Junctions 30–31) (Temporary Restriction of Traffic) Order (SI 2011/2319)
- The A3(M) Motorway and the A27 Trunk Road (A3(M) Junctions 4 – 5) (Temporary Restriction of Traffic) Order (SI 2011/2320)
- The M27 Motorway (Junction 12, Eastbound) (Temporary Prohibition of Traffic) Order (SI 2011/2321)
- The A428 Trunk Road (Tithe Farm Roundabout to Caxton Gibbet Roundabout, Cambridgeshire) (Temporary Prohibition of Traffic) Order (SI 2011/2322)
- The Health Research Authority (Establishment and Constitution) Order (SI 2011/2323)
- The Vehicle Drivers (Certificates of Professional Competence) (Amendment) Regulations (SI 2011/2324)
- The Education (Information About Individual Pupils) (Wales) (Amendment) Regulations (SI 2011/2325)
- The A487 Trunk Road (Tremadog Roundabout to Porthmadog Roundabout, South of Tremadog, Gwynedd) (Temporary Traffic Restrictions) Order (SI 2011/2326)
- The M4 Motorway (Westbound Carriageway at Junction 32 (Coryton), Cardiff) (Temporary Prohibition of Vehicles) Order (SI 2011/2327)
- The A5 Trunk Road (Gailey Wharf, Staffordshire) (Temporary 30 Miles Per Hour Speed Limit) Order (SI 2011/2328)
- The Postal Services Act 2011 (Commencement 1 and Transitional Provisions) Order (SI 2011/2329)
- The A55 Trunk Road (Glan Conwy – Conwy Morfa, Conwy County Borough) (Temporary 70 mph Speed Limit) Order (SI 2011/2330)
- The Weights and Measures (Specified Quantities) (Unwrapped Bread and Intoxicating Liquor) Order (SI 2011/2331)
- The Construction Contracts (England) Exclusion Order (SI 2011/2332)
- The Scheme for Construction Contracts (England and Wales) Regulations 1998 (Amendment) (England) Regulations (SI 2011/2333)
- The A404 Trunk Road and the A404(M) Motorway (A404(M) Junction 9B – M40 Junction 4) (Temporary Restriction and Prohibition of Traffic) Order (SI 2011/2334)
- The A1 Trunk Road and the A1(M) Motorway (A5135 Junction – Junction 6) (Temporary Prohibition of Traffic) Order (SI 2011/2335)
- The A21 Trunk Road (North Farm Roundabout — A2014 Junction) (Temporary Speed Restrictions) Order (SI 2011/2336)
- The A23 Trunk Road and the A27 Trunk Road (Patcham Interchange, Northbound) (Temporary Prohibition of Traffic) Order (SI 2011/2337)
- The A5 Trunk Road (Redmoor Interchange to Old Stratford Roundabout, Milton Keynes) (Temporary Prohibition of Traffic) Order (SI 2011/2338)
- The M5 Motorway (Junction 21 Northbound Entry Slip Road) (Temporary Prohibition of Traffic) Order (SI 2011/2339)
- The A14 Trunk Road (Huntingdon Rail Viaduct to Hemingford Abbots, Cambridgeshire) Eastbound (Temporary Restriction and Prohibition of Traffic) Order (SI 2011/2340)
- The Health Research Authority Regulations (SI 2011/2341)
- The First-tier Tribunal and Upper Tribunal (Chambers) (Amendment) Order (SI 2011/2342)
- The Tribunal Procedure (Upper Tribunal) (Amendment) Rules (SI 2011/2343)
- The Upper Tribunal (Immigration and Asylum Chamber) (Judicial Review) (England and Wales) Fees Order (SI 2011/2344)
- The National Minimum Wage (Amendment) Regulations (SI 2011/2345)
- The Solicitors Disciplinary Tribunal (Appeals and Amendment) Rules (SI 2011/2346)
- The National Minimum Wage (Amendment) (No.2) Regulations (SI 2011/2347)
- The A12 Trunk Road (Junction 15 Webbs Farm Interchange to Junction 19 Boreham Interchange, Chelmsford, Essex) (Temporary Restriction and Prohibition of Traffic) Order (SI 2011/2348)
- The A494 Trunk Road (Ruthin, Denbighshire) (Temporary Traffic Restrictions and Prohibitions) Order (SI 2011/2349)
- The A35 Trunk Road (Penn, Near Charmouth) (Temporary Prohibition and Restriction of Traffic) Order (SI 2011/2350)
- The A2 Trunk Road (Dartford Heath, Slip Roads) (Temporary Prohibition of Traffic) ( 2) Order (SI 2011/2351)
- The A30 Trunk Road (Shallowater, Near Bodmin) (Temporary Prohibition and Restriction of Traffic) Order (SI 2011/2352)
- The A259 Trunk Road (Bexhill) (Temporary Restriction and Prohibition of Traffic) Order (SI 2011/2353)
- The A465 Trunk Road (Eastbound Slip Roads at Llanfoist Junction, Llanfoist, Monmouthshire) (Temporary Prohibition of Vehicles) Order (SI 2011/2354)
- The A21 Trunk Road (Kipping?s Cross Roundabout – Scotney Castle Roundabout) (Temporary Restriction and Prohibition of Traffic) Order (SI 2011/2355)
- The M4 Motorway (Junctions 16 & 17 Slip Roads) (Temporary Prohibition and Restriction of Traffic) Order (SI 2011/2356)
- The M53 Motorway (Junctions 4–7, Northbound and Southbound Carriageways and Slip Roads) (Temporary Prohibition and Restriction of Traffic) Order (SI 2011/2357)
- The A1 Trunk Road (Leeming to Scotch Corner) (Temporary Restriction and Prohibition of Traffic) Order (SI 2011/2358)
- The A66 Trunk Road (Dyson Lane to Gallow Hill) (Temporary Restriction and Prohibition of Traffic) Order (SI 2011/2359)
- The M1 Motorway (Junction 28 to Junction 29) (Temporary 50 Miles Per Hour Speed Restriction) Order (SI 2011/2360)
- The M1 Motorway (Junction 16) (Temporary Restriction and Prohibition of Traffic) Order (SI 2011/2361)
- The Health Act 2009 (Commencement 2) (Wales) Order (SI 2011/2362)
- The A1 Trunk Road (Long Bennington, Lincolnshire) (Temporary Prohibition of Traffic) Order (SI 2011/2363)
- The Feed-in Tariffs (Specified Maximum Capacity and Functions) (Amendment No.3) Order (SI 2011/2364)
- The A43 Trunk Road (Silverstone, Northamptonshire) (Slip Road) (Temporary Prohibition of Traffic) Order (SI 2011/2365)
- The M6 Toll Road, the M6 Motorway (Junctions 4a and 4) and the M42 Motorway (Junctions 7a – 6) (Temporary Prohibition of Traffic) Order (SI 2011/2366)
- The M42 Motorway (Junction 11) (Temporary Restriction and Prohibition of Traffic) Order (SI 2011/2367)
- The M5 and M6 Motorways (M5 Junction 2 to M6 Junction 9) (Temporary Restriction and Prohibition of Traffic) Order (SI 2011/2368)
- The A663 Trunk Road (Broadway, Chadderton) and the M60 (Junction 21 Clockwise Exit Slip Road) (Temporary Prohibition and Restriction of Traffic) Order (SI 2011/2369)
- The M6 Motorway (Junction 37 Northbound and Southbound Carriageways) (Temporary Restriction of Traffic) Order (SI 2011/2370)
- The A627 (M) Motorway (Junctions 1- 4) and M62 Motorway Junction 20 (Temporary Prohibition and Restriction of Traffic) Order (SI 2011/2371)
- The M65 Motorway (Junctions 2–3 Eastbound Carriageway and Slip Roads) and the M61 (Junction 9 Link Road) (Temporary Prohibition of Traffic) Order No 2 (SI 2011/2372)
- The A470 Trunk Road (Taffs Well Interchange, Cardiff to Nantgarw Interchange, Rhondda Cynon Taf) (Temporary Prohibition of Vehicles) Order (SI 2011/2373)
- The M62 Motorway (Junction 34 Junction 35) (Temporary Prohibition of Traffic) Order (SI 2011/2374)
- The A64 Trunk Road (East Heslerton to Staxton and Pickering Interchange) (Temporary Restriction and Prohibition of Traffic) Order (SI 2011/2375)
- The A1(M) Motorway (Junction 63 to Junction 65) and the A194(M) Motorway (Temporary Restriction and Prohibition of Traffic) Order (SI 2011/2376)
- The Animal By-Products (Enforcement) ( 2) (Wales) Regulations (SI 2011/2377)
- The Poultry Health Scheme (Fees) (Wales) Regulations (SI 2011/2378)
- The Trade in Animals and Related Products (Wales) Regulations (SI 2011/2379)
- The A44 Trunk Road (Various Locations between Llangurig and Eisteddfa Gurig, Powys) (Temporary Traffic Restrictions & Prohibition) Order (SI 2011/2380)
- The M4 Motorway (Junction 45, Ynysforgan, Swansea) (Temporary Prohibition of Vehicles) Order (SI 2011/2381)
- The A494 Trunk Road (East of Ruthin, Denbighshire) (Temporary Traffic Prohibitions and Restriction) Order (SI 2011/2382)
- The A483 Trunk Road (Junction 4, Ruthin Road Interchange to Junction 5, Mold Road Interchange, Wrexham) (Temporary Prohibitions and 40 MPH Speed Limit) Order (SI 2011/2383)
- The A4042 Trunk Road (Llanellen Bridge, Llanellen, Monmouthshire) (Temporary Prohibition of Vehicles) Order (SI 2011/2384)
- The National Lottery etc. Act 1993 (Big Lottery Fund) (Amendment of Schedule 4A) Order (SI 2011/2385)
- The A1(M) Motorway (Junction 45) (Temporary Restriction of Traffic) Order (SI 2011/2386)
- The A5 Trunk Road (High Street North to London Road, Dunstable, Bedfordshire) (Prohibition and Restriction of Waiting, Loading and Unloading) Order (SI 2011/2387)
- The A14 Trunk Road (Woolpit Interchange to St. Saviours Interchange, Suffolk) Westbound (Temporary Restriction and Prohibition of Traffic) Order (SI 2011/2388)
- The A1(M) Motorway (Junction 6 to Junction 10, Hertfordshire) (Temporary 50 Miles Per Hour Speed Restriction) Order (SI 2011/2389)
- The Libya (Asset-Freezing) (Amendment) Regulations (SI 2011/2390)
- The Finance ( 3) Act 2010, Schedule 10 and the Finance Act 2009, Schedule 55 and Sections 101 to 103 (Appointed Day, etc.) (Construction Industry Scheme) Order (SI 2011/2391)
- The Education (National Curriculum) (Key Stages 1, 2 and 3 Assessment Arrangements) (England) (Amendment) Order (SI 2011/2392)
- The A12 Trunk Road (Margaretting Bypass, Trueloves Interchange to Webb's Farm Interchange, Essex) (Temporary Restriction and Prohibition of Traffic) Order (SI 2011/2393)
- The A14 Trunk Road (Between Woolpit and Haughley, Suffolk) (Temporary Restriction and Prohibition of Traffic) Order (SI 2011/2394)
- The M621 Motorway (Gildersome Interchange to Junction 1) (Temporary Restriction and Prohibition of Traffic) Order (SI 2011/2395)
- The A14 Trunk Road (Junction 59 Trimley Interchange to Junction 60 Dock Spur Roundabout, Felixstowe, Suffolk) (Temporary 50 Miles Per Hour Speed Restriction) Order (SI 2011/2396)
- The Oxford Radcliffe Hospitals National Health Service Trust (Change of Name) (Establishment) Amendment Order (SI 2011/2397)
- The A40 Trunk Road (Southbound Exit Slip Road at Monmouth, Monmouthshire) (Temporary Prohibition of Vehicles) Order (SI 2011/2398)
- The A30 Trunk Road (Exeter Airport to Daisymount Junction, Devon) (Temporary Prohibition of Traffic) Order (SI 2011/2399)
- The A419 Trunk Road (A420 White Hart Junction, Swindon) (Temporary Prohibition and Restriction of Traffic) Order (SI 2011/2400)

== 2401–2500 ==
- The Finance Act 2009, Section 103 (Appointed Day) Order (SI 2011/2401)
- The M4 Motorway (Junctions 15 – 16) (Temporary Restriction of Traffic) Order (SI 2011/2402)
- The M20 Motorway (Junctions 8 – 7) (Temporary Restriction of Traffic) Order (SI 2011/2403)
- The A21 Trunk Road (Scotney Castle Roundabout — Maplehurst Road) (Temporary Restriction and Prohibition of Traffic) Order (SI 2011/2404)
- The A27 Trunk Road (Lewes Road, Near Eastbourne) (Temporary Speed Restrictions) Order (SI 2011/2405)
- The M25 Motorway (Junction 5, Southbound Exit Slip Road) (Temporary Prohibition of Traffic) Order (SI 2011/2406)
- The M60 Motorway (Junctions 1- 26 Clockwise and Anticlockwise Carriageways and Slip Roads) (Temporary Prohibition of Traffic) Order (SI 2011/2407)
- The A465 Trunk Road (Rassau Roundabout to Brynmawr Roundabout, Blaenau Gwent) (Temporary Prohibition of Vehicles) Order (SI 2011/2408)
- The A590 Trunk Road (Lindale Hill Resurfacing) (Temporary Prohibition and Restriction of Traffic) Order (SI 2011/2409)
- The M6 Motorway (Northbound Exit Slip Road Leading to Rob Lane Motorway Depot) (Temporary Prohibition of Traffic) (No 2) Order (SI 2011/2410)
- The M53 Motorway (Junction 6 Northbound and Southbound Exit and Entry Slip Roads) (Temporary Prohibition of Traffic) Order (SI 2011/2411)
- The M180 Motorway (Junction 5) (Temporary Prohibition of Traffic) Order (SI 2011/2412)
- The A64 Trunk Road (Tadcaster Bar) (Temporary Prohibition of Traffic) Order (SI 2011/2413)
- The A48 Trunk Road (Pont Abraham Roundabout to Cross Hands Business Park, Carmarthenshire) (Temporary Traffic Restrictions & Prohibitions) Order (SI 2011/2414)
- The Local Inquiries, Qualifying Inquiries and Qualifying Procedures (Standard Daily Amount) (Wales) Regulations (SI 2011/2415)
- The M62 Motorway (Junction 34 Junction 35) (Temporary 50 Miles Per Hour Speed Restriction) Order (SI 2011/2416)
- The M62 Motorway (Junction 34 to Little Heck Railway Bridge) (Temporary Restriction and Prohibition of Traffic) Order (SI 2011/2417)
- The M1 Motorway (Junction 44 and Junction 46) (Temporary Prohibition of Traffic) Order (SI 2011/2418)
- The Nuffield Orthopaedic Centre National Health Service Trust (Transfer of Trust Property) Order (SI 2011/2419)
- The Nuffield Orthopaedic Centre National Health Service Trust (Dissolution) Order (SI 2011/2420)
- The A1 Trunk Road (Redhouse Junction to Went Edge Road) (Temporary Prohibition of Traffic) Order (SI 2011/2421)
- The A66 Trunk Road (Blands Corner Roundabout to Neasham Road Roundabout) (Temporary 40 Miles Per Hour Speed Restriction) Order (SI 2011/2422)
- The Social Fund Cold Weather Payments (General) Amendment Regulations (SI 2011/2423)
- The A590 Trunk Road (Rusland Pool, Haverthwaite, Resurfacing) (Temporary Restriction and Prohibition of Traffic) Order (SI 2011/2424)
- The Social Security (Miscellaneous Amendments) ( 3) Regulations (SI 2011/2425)
- The Social Security (Disability Living Allowance, Attendance Allowance and Carer's Allowance) (Miscellaneous Amendments) Regulations (SI 2011/2426)
- The Welfare Reform Act 2009 (Commencement 5) Order (SI 2011/2427)
- The Social Security (Work-focused Interviews for Lone Parents and Partners) (Amendment) Regulations (SI 2011/2428)
- The A477 Trunk Road (East of Red Roses, Carmarthenshire) (Temporary 40 MPH Speed Limit) Order (SI 2011/2429)
- The Education (Student Support) (European University Institute) Regulations 2010 (Amendment) ( 2) Regulations (SI 2011/2430)
- The Civil Enforcement of Parking Contraventions Designation Order (SI 2011/2431)
- The Air Navigation (Amendment) Order (SI 2011/2432)
- The International Tax Enforcement (Curaçao, Sint Maarten and BES Islands) Order (SI 2011/2433)
- The International Tax Enforcement (Liberia) Order (SI 2011/2434)
- The International Tax Enforcement (Aruba) Order (SI 2011/2435)
- The Transfer of Functions (Her Majesty's Land Registry, the Meteorological Office and Ordnance Survey) Order (SI 2011/2436)
- The Iraq (United Nations Sanctions) (Amendment) Order (SI 2011/2437)
- The International Renewable Energy Agency (Legal Capacities) Order (SI 2011/2438)
- The Scotland Act 1998 (Agency Arrangements) (Specification) Order (SI 2011/2439)
- The Belarus (Restrictive Measures) (Overseas Territories) Order (SI 2011/2440)
- The Double Taxation Relief and International Tax Enforcement (South Africa) Order (SI 2011/2441)
- The Double Taxation Relief and International Tax Enforcement (Mauritius) Order (SI 2011/2442)
- The Cluster Munitions (Prohibitions) Act 2010 (Isle of Man) Order (SI 2011/2443)
- The Immigration (Guernsey) Order (SI 2011/2444)
- The A470 Trunk Road (Llanrwst, Conwy) (Temporary Traffic Restrictions and Prohibitions) Order (SI 2011/2445)
- The Taxes and Duties, etc. (Interest Rate) Regulations (SI 2011/2446)
- The Child Trust Funds (Amendment 3) Regulations (SI 2011/2447)
- The Bus Service Operators Grant (England) (Amendment) Regulations (SI 2011/2448)
- The A483 Trunk Road (Ffairfach to Llandeilo, Carmarthenshire) (Temporary Traffic Restriction and Prohibitions) Order (SI 2011/2449)
- The M4 Motorway (Eastbound Exit Slip Road at Junction 37 (Pyle), Bridgend County Borough) (Temporary Prohibition of Vehicles) Order (SI 2011/2450)
- The Agricultural Holdings (Units of Production) (England) Order (SI 2011/2451)
- The Energy Performance of Buildings (Certificates and Inspections) (England and Wales) (Amendment) Regulations (SI 2011/2452)
- The Storage of Carbon Dioxide (Amendment of the Energy Act 2008 etc.) Regulations (SI 2011/2453)
- The A36 Trunk Road (Steeple Langford to Stapleford, Wiltshire) (Temporary Restriction of Traffic) Order (SI 2011/2454)
- The Southgate College (Dissolution) Order (SI 2011/2455)
- The M5 Motorway (Junctions 11A – 12 Painswick Overbridge) (Temporary Restriction of Traffic) Order (SI 2011/2456)
- The A30 Trunk Road (Carland Cross to Chiverton Cross, Cornwall) (Temporary Prohibition of Traffic) Order (SI 2011/2457)
- The M11 Motorway (Junction 8 to Junction 10, Essex and Cambridgeshire) (Temporary Prohibition of Traffic) Order (SI 2011/2458)
- The Finance Act 2011, Section 42 (Appointed Day) Order (SI 2011/2459)
- The Commons Act 2006 (Commencement 6) (England) Order (SI 2011/2460)
- The Air Navigation (Restriction of Flying) (London Remembrance Events) (Amendment) Regulations (SI 2011/2461)
- The Air Navigation (Restriction of Flying) (Sculthorpe Airfield) (Revocation) Regulations (SI 2011/2462)
- The A14 Trunk Road (Junction 13 Thrapston, Northamptonshire) Eastbound Entry Slip Road (Temporary Prohibition of Traffic) Order (SI 2011/2463)
- The M1 Motorway (Newport Pagnell Buckinghamshire and Junction 14 Milton Keynes) Slip Roads (Temporary Prohibition of Traffic) Order (SI 2011/2464)
- The A12 Trunk Road (Rivenhall End, Braintree, Essex) (Temporary Restriction and Prohibition of Traffic) Order (SI 2011/2465)
- The M40 Motorway (Junctions 2 to 8) and the A404 Trunk Road (Buckinghamshire and Oxfordshire) (Temporary Prohibition of Traffic) Order (SI 2011/2466)
- The M6 Motorway (Junction 5) (Northbound Exit Slip Road) (Temporary Prohibition of Traffic) Order (SI 2011/2467)
- The Crime and Disorder Act 1998 (Responsible Authorities) (Amendment) Order (SI 2011/2468)
- The A477 Trunk Road (Backe Road Junction to Llanddowror, Carmarthenshire) (Temporary Traffic Restrictions and Prohibition) Order (SI 2011/2469)
- The M6 Motorway (Junction 6 to Junction 7) (Temporary Restriction and Prohibition of Traffic) Order (SI 2011/2470)
- The M5 and M42 Motorways (M5 Junction 4a to M42 Junction 2) (Temporary Prohibition of Traffic) Order (SI 2011/2471)
- The A5 Trunk Road (Gailey, Staffordshire) (Temporary Prohibition of Traffic in Laybys) Order (SI 2011/2472)
- The A46 Trunk Road (Warwick to Stoneleigh) (Temporary Prohibition of Traffic) Order (SI 2011/2473)
- The A46 Trunk Road (East Stoke, Nottinghamshire) (Footway) (Temporary Prohibition of Traffic) Order (SI 2011/2474)
- The Housing (Wales) Measure 2011 (Commencement 1) Order (SI 2011/2475)
- The A42 Trunk Road (Breedon on the Hill, Leicestershire) (Temporary Restriction of Traffic) Order (SI 2011/2476)
- The M4 Motorway (Junctions 12 – 13) (Temporary Restriction and Prohibition of Traffic) Order (SI 2011/2477)
- The M6 Motorway (Junction 35, Northbound Exit Slip Road) (Temporary Prohibition of Traffic) Order (SI 2011/2478)
- The Syria (Asset-Freezing) (Amendment) Regulations (SI 2011/2479)
- The M5 Motorway (Junctions 11A-12) (Number 2) (Temporary Restriction of Traffic) Order (SI 2011/2480)
- The A36 Trunk Road (Churchill Way West, Salisbury) (Temporary Prohibition of Traffic) Order (SI 2011/2481)
- The M5 Motorway (Junctions 14–13, Michael Wood Services) (Temporary Prohibition of Traffic) Order (SI 2011/2482)
- The A4232 Trunk Road (Culverhouse Cross Interchange to Drope Road Overbridge, Cardiff) (Temporary 40 MPH Speed Limit) Order (SI 2011/2483)
- The M4 Motorway (Junction 33, Capel Llanilltern, Cardiff, Westbound On-Slip Road) (Temporary Prohibition of Vehicles) Order (SI 2011/2484)
- The Constitutional Reform and Governance Act 2010 (Commencement 6, Specified Day and Transitional Provision) Order (SI 2011/2485)
- The Marketing of Fresh Horticultural Produce (Wales) (Amendment) Regulations (SI 2011/2486)
- The Cirencester Tertiary College Sixth Form College Corporation Designation (England) Order (SI 2011/2487)
- The M4 Motorway (Junctions 17 – 18) (Temporary Restriction of Traffic) Order (SI 2011/2488)
- The Immigration (Designation of Travel Bans) (Amendment No.6) Order (SI 2011/2489)
- The Prostitution (Public Places) (Scotland) Act 2007 (Disqualification from Driving) Order (SI 2011/2490)
- The Airport Charges Regulations (SI 2011/2491)
- The Offshore Installations (Safety Zones) ( 4) Order (SI 2011/2492)
- The A36 Trunk Road (Partridge Hill, Newton, Wiltshire) (Temporary Restriction of Traffic) Order (SI 2011/2493)
- The A419 Trunk Road (Commonhead Roundabout, Swindon) (Temporary Prohibition of Traffic) Order (SI 2011/2494)
- The A419 Trunk Road (Seven Bridges West, Near Swindon) (Temporary Prohibition and Restriction of Traffic) Order (SI 2011/2495)
- The M4 Motorway (Junctions 20–21) and M48 Motorway (Temporary Restriction of Traffic) Order (SI 2011/2496)
- The M5 Motorway (Junction 18) to M49 Motorway (Temporary Prohibition and Restriction of Traffic) Order (SI 2011/2497)
- The Protection from Tobacco (Sales from Vending Machines) (Wales) Regulations (SI 2011/2498)
- The Waste and Emissions Trading Act 2003 (Amendment) Regulations (SI 2011/2499)
- The Mental Health (Assessment of Former Users of Secondary Mental Health Services) (Wales) Regulations (SI 2011/2500)

== 2501–2600 ==
- The Mental Health (Independent Mental Health Advocates) (Wales) Regulations (SI 2011/2501)
- The A55 Trunk Road(Conwy Tunnel, Conwy County Borough) (Temporary Traffic Restriction & Prohibitions) (No.2) Order (SI 2011/2502)
- The Income Tax (Manufactured Overseas Dividends) (Amendment 2) Regulations (SI 2011/2503)
- The M5 Motorway (Junction 11A) (Temporary Prohibition of Traffic) Order (SI 2011/2504)
- The M5 Motorway (Junction 16) (Temporary Prohibition of Traffic) Order (SI 2011/2505)
- The M5 Motorway (Junction 16) (Temporary Prohibition of Traffic) (No 2) Order (SI 2011/2506)
- The M4 Motorway (Junction 19 Westbound Exit Slip Road) (Temporary Prohibition of Traffic) Order (SI 2011/2507)
- The M5 Motorway (Junctions 14–15) (Temporary Prohibition of Traffic) Order (SI 2011/2508)
- The A303 Trunk Road (Wincanton Interchange, Somerset) (Temporary Restriction of Traffic) Order (SI 2011/2509)
- The A36 Trunk Road (Stapleford to South Newton, near Salisbury) (Temporary Restriction of Traffic) Order (SI 2011/2510)
- The M6 Motorway (Junctions 30–31 Northbound Carriageway) (Temporary Restriction of Traffic) Order (SI 2011/2511)
- The Export (Penalty) (Amendment) Regulations (SI 2011/2512)
- The A470 Trunk Road (Various Locations between Llandinam and Cemmaes, Powys) (Temporary Traffic Restrictions & Prohibition) Order (SI 2011/2513)
- The A483 Trunk Road (Ammanford, Carmarthenshire) (Various Waiting Restrictions) Order (SI 2011/2514)
- The Police Reform and Social Responsibility Act 2011 (Commencement 1) Order (SI 2011/2515)
- The Motor Vehicles (Driving Licences) (Amendment) Regulations (SI 2011/2516)
- The A30 Trunk Road (Scorrier Junction, Near Redruth) (Temporary Prohibition and Restriction of Traffic) Order (SI 2011/2517)
- The A1 Trunk Road (Clifton to Felton) (Temporary Restriction and Prohibition of Traffic) Order (SI 2011/2518)
- The A1(M) Motorway (Junction 35 to Junction 37) (Temporary Prohibition of Traffic) Order (SI 2011/2519)
- The M606 Motorway (Junction 1) (Temporary Prohibition of Traffic) Order (SI 2011/2520)
- The M180 Motorway (Junction 2) (Temporary Prohibition of Traffic) Order (SI 2011/2521)
- The A446 Trunk Road (A452/Chester Road to M6 Junction 4) (Temporary Restriction and Prohibition of Traffic) Order (SI 2011/2522)
- The M6 Motorway (Junction 4a) (Link Road) (Temporary Prohibition of Traffic) Order (SI 2011/2523)
- The M5 Motorway (Junction 4 to Junction 3) (Temporary Prohibition of Traffic) Order (SI 2011/2524)
- The M42 Motorway (Junction 2) (Southbound Entry Slip Road) (Temporary Prohibition of Traffic) (No.2) Order (SI 2011/2525)
- The M5 Motorway (Junction 9) and the A46 Trunk Road (Temporary Prohibition of Traffic) Order (SI 2011/2526)
- The M42 and M6 Motorways (M42 Junction 8) (Link Road) (Temporary Prohibition of Traffic) Order (SI 2011/2527)
- The A45 Trunk Road (Higham Ferrers to M1 Junction 15, Northamptonshire) (Temporary Restriction and Prohibition of Traffic) Order (SI 2011/2528)
- The A34 Trunk Road (Chieveley Interchange, Northbound) (Temporary Prohibition of Traffic) Order (SI 2011/2529)
- The M20 Motorway (Junctions 5 – 7) (Temporary Restriction of Traffic) Order (SI 2011/2530)
- The M3 Motorway (Junction 2, Westbound Carriageway) (Temporary Prohibition of Traffic) Order (SI 2011/2531)
- The A27 Trunk Road (Wilmington – Folkington) (Temporary Restriction and Prohibition of Traffic) Order (SI 2011/2532)
- The A27 Trunk Road (Firle – Selmeston) (50 Miles Per Hour Speed Limit) Order (SI 2011/2533)
- The Customs (Contravention of a Relevant Rule) (Amendment) Regulations (SI 2011/2534)
- The A26 Trunk Road (Southease Railway Station – Tarring Neville) (Temporary Speed Restrictions) ( 2) Order (SI 2011/2535)
- The M11 Motorway (Chigwell Police Control Centre, Slip Road) (Temporary Suspension of a Statutory Provision) Order 2008 Variation Order (SI 2011/2536)
- The M42 Motorway (Junction 4) (Temporary Prohibition of Traffic) Order (SI 2011/2537)
- The A487 Trunk Road (Fishguard, Pembrokeshire) (Temporary Prohibition of Vehicles) Order (SI 2011/2538)
- The A494 & A550 Trunk Roads (Deeside Interchange, Flintshire) (Temporary Prohibition of Vehicles) Order (SI 2011/2539)
- The A12 Trunk Road (Bentley Longwood to Capel St Mary, Suffolk) (Temporary Restriction and Prohibition of Traffic) Order (SI 2011/2540)
- The A14 Trunk Road (Junction 38 Waterhall Interchange, Newmarket, Suffolk) (Temporary Prohibition of Traffic) Order (SI 2011/2541)
- The A14 Trunk Road (Creeting St Mary – Stowmarket, Suffolk) Westbound (Temporary Restriction and Prohibition of Traffic) Order (SI 2011/2542)
- The M4 Motorway (Winnersh Interchange) (Temporary Restriction and Prohibition of Traffic) Order (SI 2011/2543)
- The M25 Motorway and the A282 Trunk Road (Junctions 26 – 31) (Temporary Prohibition of Traffic) Order (SI 2011/2544)
- The A500 Trunk Road (Stoke-on-Trent, Staffordshire) (Temporary Prohibition of Traffic) (No.3) Order (SI 2011/2545)
- The A30 Trunk Road (Avers Roundabout to Scorrier Interchange, Redruth, Cornwall) (Temporary Prohibition and Restriction of Traffic) Order (SI 2011/2546)
- The Care Quality Commission (Membership) (Amendment) Regulations (SI 2011/2547)
- The M4 Motorway (Junctions 15–16) (Temporary Prohibition of Traffic) Order (SI 2011/2548)
- The M5 Motorway (Junctions 19–20) (Temporary Prohibition and Restriction of Traffic) Order (SI 2011/2549)
- The A30 Trunk Road (Jamaica Inn, Bolventor, Cornwall) (Temporary Speed Restriction) Order (SI 2011/2550)
- The M62 Motorway (Junction 20, Westbound Exit Slip Road) (Temporary Prohibition of Traffic) Order (SI 2011/2551)
- The Armed Forces and Reserve Forces (Compensation Scheme) (Amendment) Order (SI 2011/2552)
- The M62 Motorway (Junctions 16–23 Eastbound and Westbound Carriageways and Slip Roads) and the M60 and Birch Service Area (Temporary Prohibition and Restriction of Traffic) Order (SI 2011/2553)
- The A5117, A550 and A494 Trunk Roads (Link and Slip Roads) (Temporary Prohibition of Traffic) Order (SI 2011/2554)
- The Landfill Allowances Scheme (Wales) (Amendment) Regulations (SI 2011/2555)
- The M5 Motorway (Junction 29 Southbound Exit Slip Road) (Temporary Prohibition of Traffic) Order (SI 2011/2556)
- The A66 Trunk Road (Lightwater Culvert, Penrith) (Temporary Restriction of Traffic) Order (SI 2011/2557)
- The A595 Trunk Road (Mirehouse to Westlakes) (Temporary Prohibition and Restriction of Traffic) Order (SI 2011/2558)
- The M67 Motorway (Junctions 1–3, Eastbound and Westbound Carriageways and Slip Roads) (Temporary Prohibition and Restriction of Traffic) Order (SI 2011/2559)
- The A14 Trunk Road (Junction 40 Higham Interchange, Suffolk) Westbound (Temporary Restriction and Prohibition of Traffic) Order (SI 2011/2560)
- The A63 Trunk Road (Brighton Street Interchange) (Temporary Prohibition of Traffic) Order (SI 2011/2561)
- The Derelict Land Clearance Area (Chantry Lane, Welwyn Hatfield) Order (SI 2011/2562)
- The A1(M) Motorway (Junction 38 to Junction 37) (Temporary Restriction and Prohibition of Traffic) Order (SI 2011/2563)
- The M180 Motorway and the A180 Trunk Road (Barnetby Interchange) (Temporary Restriction and Prohibition of Traffic) Order (SI 2011/2564)
- The M62 Motorway (Junction 32, Castleford) (Temporary Prohibition of Traffic) ( 3) Order (SI 2011/2565)
- The A1(M) Motorway (Junction 62 to Junction 63) (Temporary Restriction and Prohibition of Traffic) Order (SI 2011/2566)
- The A1 Trunk Road (Fawdon Interchange to Seaton Burn Interchange) (Temporary Prohibition of Traffic) Order (SI 2011/2567)
- The A1 Trunk Road (Shotton Interchange) (Temporary Restriction and Prohibition of Traffic) Order (SI 2011/2568)
- The A1 Trunk Road (Guyzance Junction to Deanmoor Junction) (Temporary Restriction and Prohibition of Traffic) Order (SI 2011/2569)
- The A63 Trunk Road (Castle Street) (Temporary Prohibition of Traffic) Order (SI 2011/2570)
- The M6 Motorway (Junctions 43-41 Southbound Carriageway) (Temporary Restriction of Traffic) Order (SI 2011/2571)
- The A66 Trunk Road (Stainton to Redhill) (Temporary Prohibition and Restriction of Traffic) Order (SI 2011/2572)
- The A21 Trunk Road (Northbridge Street Roundabout) (Temporary Prohibition of Traffic) Order (SI 2011/2573)
- The A23 Trunk Road (Bolney Interchange – Pease Pottage) (Temporary Prohibition of Traffic) ( 2) Order (SI 2011/2574)
- The Designation of Schools having a Religious Character (England) Order (SI 2011/2575)
- The Budget Responsibility and National Audit Act 2011 (Commencement No.2) Order (SI 2011/2576)
- The A259 Trunk Road (Little Common Road, Bexhill) (Temporary Prohibition of Traffic) Order (SI 2011/2577)
- The M2 Motorway (Junction 7) (Temporary Restriction and Prohibition of Traffic) Order (SI 2011/2578)
- The M3 Motorway (Junction 12, Southbound Entry Slip Road) (Temporary Prohibition of Traffic) Order (SI 2011/2579)
- The A259 Trunk Road (Various Roads, Rye) (Temporary Restriction and Prohibition of Traffic) Order (SI 2011/2580)
- The Public Services Reform (Scotland) Act 2010 (Consequential Modifications of Enactments) Order (SI 2011/2581)
- The A14 Trunk Road (Junction 24 Godmanchester to Junction 26 St Ives, Cambridgeshire) (Temporary Restriction and Prohibition of Traffic) Order (SI 2011/2582)
- The M5 Motorway (Junction 9) (Temporary Prohibition and Restriction of Traffic) Order (SI 2011/2583)
- The M1 Motorway (Junctions 14 to 15, Milton Keynes) (Temporary Restriction and Prohibition of Traffic) Order (SI 2011/2584)
- The A14 Trunk Road (Junction 23 Spittals Interchange, Huntingdon, Cambridgeshire) Eastbound Exit Slip Road (Temporary Prohibition of Traffic) Order (SI 2011/2585)
- The National Health Service Pension Scheme, Injury Benefits and Additional Voluntary Contributions (Amendment) Regulations (SI 2011/2586)
- The Marketing of Fresh Horticultural Produce (Amendment) Regulations (SI 2011/2587)
- The A12 Trunk Road (Junction 12 Marylands Interchange to Junction 15 Webb's Farm Interchange, Essex) (Temporary Restriction and Prohibition of Traffic) Order (SI 2011/2588)
- The M58 Motorway (Orrell Interchange) (Link Road between the Eastern Roundabout and the A577 Orrell Road) (Temporary Prohibition of Traffic) Order (SI 2011/2589)
- The A5 Trunk Road (Cannock, Staffordshire) (Temporary Prohibition and Restriction of Traffic) Order (SI 2011/2590)
- The M40 Motorway (Junction 16) (Temporary Restriction and Prohibition of Traffic) Order (SI 2011/2591)
- The M54 Motorway (Junction 5) (Slip Roads) (Temporary Prohibition of Traffic) Order (SI 2011/2592)
- The A45 Trunk Road (Chowns Mill Roundabout to Thrapston Roundabout, Northamptonshire) (Temporary Prohibition of Traffic) Order (SI 2011/2593)
- The A1 Trunk Road (Dunston Interchange) (Temporary Prohibition of Traffic) ( 2) Order (SI 2011/2594)
- The M1 Motorway (Junction 37) (Temporary Prohibition of Traffic) Order (SI 2011/2595)
- The M18 Motorway (Junction 1 to Junction 2) (Temporary Restriction and Prohibition of Traffic) Order (SI 2011/2596)
- The Sports Grounds Safety Authority Act 2011 (Commencement) Order (SI 2011/2597)
- The Freedom of Information (Designation as Public Authorities) Order (SI 2011/2598)
- The Traffic Management (London Borough of Barking and Dagenham) Permit Scheme Order (SI 2011/2599)
- The Traffic Management (London Borough of Hillingdon) Permit Scheme Order (SI 2011/2600)

== 2601–2700 ==
- The Merchant Shipping (Port State Control) Regulations (SI 2011/2601)
- The Audit and Assessment Reports (Wales) (Amendment) Order (SI 2011/2602)
- The A483 Trunk Road (Newbridge Bypass, Newbridge, Wrexham) (Temporary Prohibition of Vehicles) Order (SI 2011/2603)
- The A55 Trunk Road (Junction 32, Halkyn, to Junction 34, Ewloe, Flintshire) (Temporary Prohibitions and 40 MPH Speed Limit) Order (SI 2011/2604)
- The A36 Trunk Road (Alderbury, near Salisbury) (Temporary Prohibition of Traffic) Order (SI 2011/2605)
- The A404(M) Motorway (Junction 9A, Slip Roads) (Temporary Prohibition of Traffic) Order (SI 2011/2606)
- The M11 Motorway (Junction 6, Southbound Exit Slip Road) (Temporary Prohibition of Traffic) Order (SI 2011/2607)
- The A13 and A1089 Trunk Roads (Wennington Interchange — Marshfoot Interchange) (Temporary Prohibition of Traffic) Order (SI 2011/2608)
- The A3(M) Motorway (Junction 4, Southbound Entry Slip Road) (Temporary Prohibition of Traffic) ( 2) Order (SI 2011/2609)
- The Non-Domestic Rating Contributions (Wales) (Amendment) Regulations (SI 2011/2610)
- The A23 Trunk Road and the A27 Trunk Road (Patcham Interchange, Slip Roads) (Temporary Prohibition of Traffic) ( 2) Order (SI 2011/2611)
- The M20 Motorway (Junctions 3 – 8) (Temporary Restriction and Prohibition of Traffic) Order (SI 2011/2612)
- The A27 Trunk Road (Falmer) (Temporary Restriction of Traffic) Order (SI 2011/2613)
- The M25 and the M11 Motorways (M25 Junctions 25 – 27 and M11 Junction 5) (Temporary Restriction and Prohibition of Traffic) Order 2011 Variation Order (SI 2011/2614)
- The M55 Motorway (Junction 1 Eastbound Link Road to the M6 Northbound) (Temporary Prohibition of Traffic) Order (SI 2011/2615)
- The Merchant Shipping (Vessel Traffic Monitoring and Reporting Requirements)(Amendment) Regulations (SI 2011/2616)
- The M6 Motorway (Junctions 39–40 Northbound and Southbound Carriageways) (Temporary Restriction of Traffic) Order (SI 2011/2617)
- The M6 Motorway (Junctions 44-43 Southbound Carriageway) (Temporary Restriction of Traffic) (No 2) Order (SI 2011/2618)
- The M20 Motorway and the A20 Trunk Road (Junction 9 – Alkham Valley Interchange) (Temporary Restriction and Prohibition of Traffic) Order (SI 2011/2619)
- The M60 Motorway (Junctions 11–13 Anticlockwise Carriageway, Slip and Link Roads) and the M62 and M602 Link Roads to the M60 Anticlockwise (Temporary Prohibition of Traffic) Order (SI 2011/2620)
- The M55 Motorway (Junction 4 Eastbound and Westbound Carriageways) (Temporary Restriction and Prohibition of Traffic) Order (SI 2011/2621)
- The M66 Motorway (Junctions 1–4 Southbound and Northbound Carriageways and Slip Roads) (Temporary Prohibition and Restriction of Traffic) Order (SI 2011/2622)
- The A66 Trunk Road (Crosthwaite Roundabout, Keswick) (Temporary Prohibition and Restriction of Traffic) Order (SI 2011/2623)
- The M6 Motorway (Junctions 29-28 Southbound Carriageway and Junction 28 Southbound Exit Slip Road) (Temporary Prohibition and Restriction of Traffic) Order (SI 2011/2624)
- The A38 Trunk Road (Ashburton, Devon) (Temporary Prohibition and Restriction of Traffic) Order (SI 2011/2625)
- The A417 and A419 Trunk Roads (Cirencester) (Temporary Prohibition of Traffic) (Number 2) Order (SI 2011/2626)
- The A11 Trunk Road (B1085 Red Lodge Interchange to A1101 Five Ways Roundabout, Suffolk) (Temporary Restriction and Prohibition of Traffic) Order (SI 2011/2627)
- The A12 Trunk Road (Breydon Bridge, Great Yarmouth, Norfolk) (Temporary Prohibition of Traffic and Pedestrians) (No.2) Order (SI 2011/2628)
- The A1(M) Motorway (Junction 17) and the A1 Trunk Road (Fletton Parkway to North of Wansford, Peterborough) Northbound (Temporary Restriction and Prohibition of Traffic) Order (SI 2011/2629)
- The A47 Trunk Road (Wisbech Bypass, Redmoor Lane Roundabout to Wisbech Roundabout, Cambridgeshire) (Temporary Restriction and Prohibition of Traffic) Order (SI 2011/2630)
- The A14 Trunk Road (Junction 57 Nacton Interchange, Ipswich, Suffolk) Eastbound (Temporary 50 Miles Per Hour Speed Restriction) Order (SI 2011/2631)
- The Road Transport Operator Regulations (SI 2011/2632)
- The Goods Vehicles (Community Licences) Regulations (SI 2011/2633)
- The Public Service Vehicles (Community Licences) Regulations (SI 2011/2634)
- The M40 Motorway (Junctions 6 to 8 and Junction 11, Oxfordshire) (Temporary Restriction and Prohibition of Traffic) Order (SI 2011/2635)
- The M11 Motorway (Junction 8 to Junction 7, Essex) (Temporary Restriction and Prohibition of Traffic) Order (SI 2011/2636)
- The A1 Trunk Road (Sandy to Astwick, Bedfordshire) (Temporary Prohibition of Traffic) Order (SI 2011/2637)
- The A38 Trunk Road (Egginton, Derbyshire) (Temporary Restriction and Prohibition of Traffic) Order (SI 2011/2638)
- The A5 Trunk Road (Emstrey, Shropshire) (Temporary Prohibition of Traffic) Order (SI 2011/2639)
- The M6 Motorway (Junction 10) (Northbound Exit Slip Road) (Temporary Prohibition of Traffic) Order (SI 2011/2640)
- The M5 and M42 Motorways (M5 Junction 3 to Junction 5; M42 Junction 1 to M5) (Temporary Restriction and Prohibition of Traffic) Order (SI 2011/2641)
- The A42 Trunk Road (Tonge, Leicestershire) (Temporary Prohibition of Traffic) Order (SI 2011/2642)
- The M40 and M42 Motorways (M42 Junction 3a) (Temporary Prohibition of Traffic) Order (SI 2011/2643)
- The A5 Trunk Road (Grendon, Warwickshire) (Temporary Prohibition of Traffic) (No.2) Order (SI 2011/2644)
- The Mental Capacity Act 2005 (Appropriate Body) (England) Amendment Regulations (SI 2011/2645)
- The Equality Act 2010 (Commencement 8) Order (SI 2011/2646)
- The Medicines Act 1968 (Pharmacy) Order (SI 2011/2647)
- The A27 Trunk Road (Langstone Interchange, Slip Roads) (Temporary Prohibition of Traffic) Order (SI 2011/2648)
- The Export Control (Al-Qaida and Taliban Sanctions) Regulations (SI 2011/2649)
- The A20 Trunk Road (Roundhill Viaduct) (Temporary Prohibition of Traffic) Order (SI 2011/2650)
- The A30 Trunk Road (Launceston) (Temporary Prohibition and Restriction of Traffic) (Number 2) Order (SI 2011/2651)
- The M3 Motorway (Junctions 10 – 13, Slip Roads) (Temporary Prohibition of Traffic) Order (SI 2011/2652)
- The A3(M) Motorway (Junction 1, Northbound) (Temporary Restriction of Traffic) Order (SI 2011/2653)
- The M25 Motorway (Junctions 29 – 30) (Temporary Prohibition of Traffic) Order (SI 2011/2654)
- The M48 Motorway (Junctions 1 – 2) (Severn Bridge) (Temporary Prohibition of Traffic) (Number 2) Order (SI 2011/2655)
- The A174 Trunk Road (Stokesley Road Interchange) (Temporary Prohibition of Traffic) Order (SI 2011/2656)
- The A40 Trunk Road (Churcham, Gloucestershire) (Temporary Prohibition of Traffic) Order (SI 2011/2657)
- The A36 Trunk Road (Wylye Junction to Wilton Roundabout, Salisbury) (Temporary Prohibition of Traffic) Order (SI 2011/2658)
- The M18 Motorway (Junction 6) (Temporary Prohibition of Traffic) Order (SI 2011/2659)
- The Substance Misuse (Formulation and Implementation of Strategy) (Wales) (Amendment) Regulations (SI 2011/2660)
- The Marriages and Civil Partnerships (Approved Premises) (Amendment) Regulations (SI 2011/2661)
- The M1 Motorway (Junction 35A to Junction 36) (Temporary Restriction and Prohibition of Traffic) Order (SI 2011/2662)
- The M62 Motorway (Junction 22 to Junction 24) (Temporary Restriction and Prohibition of Traffic) Order (SI 2011/2663)
- The A303 Trunk Road (Cartgate Roundabout to Podimore Roundabout, Near Yeovil) (Temporary Prohibition of Traffic) Order (SI 2011/2664)
- The A303 Trunk Road (Hazelgrove Roundabout to Podimore Roundabout, Somerset) (Temporary Prohibition of Traffic) Order (SI 2011/2665)
- The M4 Motorway (Junction 22) (Temporary Prohibition of Traffic) Order (SI 2011/2666)
- The Merchant Shipping (Flag State Directive) Regulations (SI 2011/2667)
- The A38 Trunk Road (Ashburton to Chudleigh Knighton, Near Newton Abbot) (Temporary Prohibition and Restriction of Traffic) Order (SI 2011/2668)
- The Safety of Sports Grounds (Designation) (No.4) Order (SI 2011/2669)
- The A4042 Trunk Road (Grove Park Roundabout to Pillmawr Road Bridge, Newport) (Temporary Traffic Restriction) Order (SI 2011/2670)
- The M62 Motorway (Junction 29) (Temporary Prohibition of Traffic) Order (SI 2011/2671)
- The M1 Motorway (Junctions 4 and 6) (Temporary Restriction and Prohibition of Traffic) Order (SI 2011/2672)
- The A1(M) Motorway (Junction 1, Southbound Exit Slip Road) (Temporary Prohibition of Traffic) Order (SI 2011/2673)
- The M6 Motorway (Junction 15 to Junction 14) (Temporary Prohibition of Traffic) Order (SI 2011/2674)
- The Disabled Persons (Badges for Motor Vehicles) (England) (Amendment) (No.2) Regulations (SI 2011/2675)
- The M2 Motorway (Junction 2) (Temporary Restriction and Prohibition of Traffic) Order (SI 2011/2676)
- The Ecodesign for Energy-Related Products (Amendment) Regulations (SI 2011/2677)
- The Immigration (Procedure for Marriage) Regulations (SI 2011/2678)
- The Immigration (Procedure for Formation of Civil Partnerships) Regulations (SI 2011/2679)
- The RTM Companies (Model Articles) (Wales) Regulations (SI 2011/2680)
- The Animal By-Products (Enforcement) and Transmissible Spongiform Encephalopathies (England) (Amendment) Regulations (SI 2011/2681)
- The Immigration (Certificate of Entitlement to Right of Abode in the United Kingdom) (Amendment) Regulations (SI 2011/2682)
- The A120 Trunk Roads (Park Road to Cansey Lane, Tendring, Essex)(Temporary Restriction and Prohibition of Traffic) Order (SI 2011/2683)
- The Right to Manage (Prescribed Particulars and Forms) (Wales) Regulations (SI 2011/2684)
- The A12 Trunk Road (Junction 25 Marks Tey Interchange to Junction 29 Crown Interchange, Essex) (Temporary Restriction and Prohibition of Traffic) Order (SI 2011/2685)
- The Private Dentistry (Wales) (Amendment) Regulations (SI 2011/2686)
- Legislative Reform (Industrial and Provident Societies and Credit Unions) Order 2011 (SI 2011/2687)
- The Proscribed Organisations (Name Changes) Order (SI 2011/2688)
- The M11 Motorway (Junction 12 to Junction 14) and the A14 Trunk Road (Junction 31) (Cambridgeshire) (Temporary Restriction and Prohibition of Traffic) Order (SI 2011/2689)
- The M40 Motorway (Junctions 1a to 4, Buckinghamshire) (Temporary Restriction and Prohibition of Traffic) Order (SI 2011/2690)
- The A14 Trunk Road (Junction 26 St. Ives to Junction 34 Fen Ditton/Horningsea) (Temporary Restriction and Prohibition of Traffic) Order (SI 2011/2691)
- The M27 Motorway (Junction 12, Link/Slip Roads) (Temporary Prohibition of Traffic) Order (SI 2011/2692)
- The A30 Trunk Road (Avers Interchange to Callestick Junction, Redruth, Cornwall) (Temporary Prohibition and Restriction of Traffic) Order (SI 2011/2693)
- The M6 Motorway (Junctions 4 to 7) (Temporary Restriction and Prohibition of Traffic) Order (SI 2011/2694)
- The A46 Trunk Road (Wanlip to Cossington, Leicestershire) (Temporary Restriction and Prohibition of Traffic) Order (SI 2011/2695)
- The Employment Income Provided Through Third Parties (Excluded Relevant Steps) Regulations (SI 2011/2696)
- The A55 Trunk Road (Eastbound Carriageway between Junction 23 (Llanddulas) and Junction 24 (Abergele), Conwy County Borough) (Temporary Traffic Restriction & Prohibitions) Order (SI 2011/2697)
- The A5 Trunk Road (Gailey Wharf, Staffordshire) (Temporary 30 Miles Per Hour Speed Limit) Variation Order (SI 2011/2698)
- The Recognised Auction Platforms Regulations (SI 2011/2699)
- The Social Security (Contributions) (Amendment 5) Regulations (SI 2011/2700)

== 2701–2800 ==
- The Terrorism Act 2000 and Proceeds of Crime Act 2002 (Business in the Regulated Sector) Order (SI 2011/2701)
- The Crime and Disorder (Formulation and Implementation of Strategy) (Wales) (Amendment) Regulations (SI 2011/2702)
- The Children and Young Persons Act 2008 (Commencement No.4) (England) Order (SI 2011/2703)
- The Electricity and Gas (Internal Markets) Regulations (SI 2011/2704)
- The Rail Vehicle Accessibility (Middleton Railway Drewry Car) and (Cairngorm Funicular Railway) Exemption (Amendment) Order (SI 2011/2705)
- The M4 Motorway (Junction 44 (Lon Las) to Junction 47 (Penllergaer), Swansea) (Temporary Prohibition of Vehicles) Order (SI 2011/2706)
- The M4 Motorway (Eastbound Entry Slip Road at Junction 35 (Pencoed), Bridgend County Borough) (Temporary Prohibition of Vehicles) Order (SI 2011/2707)
- The A483 Trunk Road (Northbound On Slip Road at Junction 3, Wrexham Bypass, Wrexham) (Temporary Prohibition of Vehicles) Order (SI 2011/2708)
- The A483 Trunk Road (Wrexham Bypass (Junction 2 – Junction 6), Wrexham) (Temporary 40 mph Speed Limit) Order (SI 2011/2709)
- The A5 Trunk Road (Cross in Hand Roundabout, Lutterworth) (Temporary Prohibition of Traffic) Order (SI 2011/2710)
- The Health and Social Care Act 2008 (Regulated Activities) (Amendment) Regulations (SI 2011/2711)
- The A64 Trunk Road (Cock Bridge Interchange) (Temporary Prohibition of Traffic) Order (SI 2011/2712)
- The A1 Trunk Road (Near Colsterworth, Lincolnshire) (Slip Road) (Temporary Prohibition of Traffic) Order (SI 2011/2713)
- The M6 Motorway (Junction 8) (Temporary Prohibition of Traffic) ( 2) Order (SI 2011/2714)
- The A50 Trunk Road (South West of Derby) (Temporary Prohibition of Traffic in Laybys) Order (SI 2011/2715)
- The Financial Services and Markets Act 2000 (Exemption) (Amendment 2) Order (SI 2011/2716)
- The Libya (Restrictive Measures) (Overseas Territories) (Amendment) Order (SI 2011/2717)
- The European Communities (Designation) ( 2) Order (SI 2011/2718)
- The Turks and Caicos Islands (Electoral District Boundary Commission) Order (SI 2011/2719)
- The Chief Inspector of Education, Children's Services and Skills Order (SI 2011/2720)
- The Fire and Rescue Services (Appointment of Inspector) (Wales) Order (SI 2011/2721)
- The Double Taxation Relief and International Tax Enforcement (Armenia) Order (SI 2011/2722)
- The Double Taxation Relief (Aircraft Crew) (Brazil) Order (SI 2011/2723)
- The Double Taxation Relief and International Tax Enforcement (China) Order (SI 2011/2724)
- The Double Taxation Relief and International Tax Enforcement (Ethiopia) Order (SI 2011/2725)
- The Double Taxation Relief and International Tax Enforcement (Hungary) Order (SI 2011/2726)
- The A38 and A516 Trunk Roads (A50 Toyota Interchange to A52 Markeaton Roundabout, Derbyshire) (Temporary Restriction and Prohibition of Traffic) Order (SI 2011/2727)
- The Cambridge City Fringes Joint Committee (Revocation) Order (SI 2011/2728)
- The A5 Trunk Road (Muckley Corner, Staffordshire) (Temporary Prohibition of Traffic) ( 2) Order (SI 2011/2729)
- The A43 Trunk Road (Silverstone to Towcester, Northamptonshire) (Temporary Prohibition of Traffic) Order (SI 2011/2730)
- The A38 Trunk Road (Markeaton Roundabout to Little Eaton Roundabout, Derby) (Temporary Prohibition of Traffic) Order (SI 2011/2731)
- The A470 Trunk Road (Pwllan, South of Llandinam, Powys) (Temporary Traffic Restrictions & Prohibition) Order (SI 2011/2732)
- The A470 Trunk Road (Caersws Bridge, Caersws, Powys) (Temporary Prohibition of Vehicles) Order (SI 2011/2733)
- The A494 Trunk Road (Golwg Hir, Gwynedd) (Temporary Traffic Restrictions & Prohibitions) Order (SI 2011/2734)
- The A616 Trunk Road (Wortley Junction to Newton Chambers Roundabout) (Temporary Prohibition of Traffic) Order (SI 2011/2735)
- The A1033 Trunk Road (Somerden Roundabout to Marfleet Roundabout) (Temporary Prohibition of Traffic) Order (SI 2011/2736)
- The A628 Trunk Road (Flouch Roundabout to Gunn Inn Junction) (Temporary Prohibition of Traffic) Order (SI 2011/2737)
- The M180 Motorway (Junction 3) (Temporary Prohibition of Traffic) Order (SI 2011/2738)
- The A180 Trunk Road (Stallingborough Interchange) (Temporary Prohibition of Traffic) ( 2) Order (SI 2011/2739)
- The A1(M) Motorway (Junction 34 to Junction 35) (Temporary Restriction and Prohibition of Traffic) Order (SI 2011/2740)
- The Infrastructure Planning (Environmental Impact Assessment) (Amendment) Regulations (SI 2011/2741)
- The Al-Qaida (Asset-Freezing) Regulations (SI 2011/2742)
- The Central Rating List (England) (Amendment) Regulations (SI 2011/2743)
- The Policing Protocol Order (SI 2011/2744)
- The A19 Trunk Road (Moor Farm to Seaton Burn) (Temporary Prohibition of Traffic) Order (SI 2011/2745)
- The A19 Trunk Road (Howdon Interchange to Holystone Interchange) (Temporary Restriction and Prohibition of Traffic) Order (SI 2011/2746)
- The A47 Trunk Road (Terrington St John to Tilney All Saints, King's Lynn, Norfolk) (Temporary Restriction and Prohibition of Traffic) ( 2) Order (SI 2011/2747)
- The NHS Bodies (Transfer of Trust Property) Order (SI 2011/2748)
- The Postal Services (Appeals to the Competition Commission) (Investigations and Extension of Time Limits) Order (SI 2011/2749)
- The Education Act 2011 (Commencement 1) Order (SI 2011/2750)
- The Education (National Curriculum) (Specified Purpose) (England) Order (SI 2011/2751)
- The West Northamptonshire Development Corporation (Area and Constitution) (Amendment) Order (SI 2011/2752)
- The Court of Protection (Amendment) Rules (SI 2011/2753)
- The A66 Trunk Road (Blackwell Roundabout to Blands Corner Roundabout) (Temporary Restriction and Prohibition of Traffic) Order (SI 2011/2754)
- The A69 Trunk Road (Throckley Interchange) (Temporary Prohibition of Traffic) Order (SI 2011/2755)
- The Wireless Telegraphy (Register) (Amendment) ( 3) Regulations (SI 2011/2756)
- The Wireless Telegraphy (Limitation of Number of Grants of Recognised Spectrum Access for Satellite Receive-Only Earth Stations) Order (SI 2011/2757)
- The A34 Trunk Road (Winnall) (Closure of Lay-bys) Order (SI 2011/2758)
- The Food Protection (Emergency Prohibitions) (Radioactivity in Sheep) (Wales) (Partial Revocation) Order (SI 2011/2759)
- The M3 Motorway (Junctions 14 – 4, Carriageways) (Temporary Restriction of Traffic) Order (SI 2011/2760)
- The Wireless Telegraphy (Recognised Spectrum Access and Licence) (Spectrum Trading) (Amendment) ( 2) Regulations (SI 2011/2761)
- The Wireless Telegraphy (Recognised Spectrum Access Charges) (Amendment) Regulations (SI 2011/2762)
- The Wireless Telegraphy (Recognised Spectrum Access for Satellite Receive-Only Earth Stations) Regulations (SI 2011/2763)
- The Epping Forest (Electoral Changes) Order (SI 2011/2764)
- The Air Navigation (Restriction of Flying) (Taunton) Regulations (SI 2011/2765)
- The Air Navigation (Restriction of Flying) (Taunton) (Revocation) Regulations (SI 2011/2766)
- The Air Navigation (Restriction of Flying) (Woodbridge) Regulations (SI 2011/2767)
- The A31 Trunk Road (Verwood Interchange, Westbound Entry Slip Road) (Temporary Prohibition of Traffic) Order (SI 2011/2768)
- The A34 Trunk Road (M3 Junction 9 – Tot Hill Interchange) (Temporary Speed Restrictions) Order (SI 2011/2769)
- The A34 Trunk Road (East Ilsley and West Ilsley Interchanges, Slip Roads) (Temporary Prohibition of Traffic) Order (SI 2011/2770)
- The A27 Trunk Road (Selmeston – Firle) (Temporary Restriction and Prohibition of Traffic) Order (SI 2011/2771)
- The A120 Trunk Road (Tinker Street, Ramsey, Essex) (Temporary Restriction and Prohibition of Traffic) Order (SI 2011/2772)
- The A12 Trunk Road (Junction 24 Kelvedon North Interchange to Junction 25 Marks Tey Interchange, Essex) Northbound (Temporary Restriction and Prohibition of Traffic) Order (SI 2011/2773)
- The A12 Trunk Road (Hatfield Peverel to Boreham, Essex) Southbound (Temporary Restriction and Prohibition of Traffic) Order (SI 2011/2774)
- The Financial Restrictions (Iran) Order (SI 2011/2775)
- The A1(M) Motorway (Junctions 8 to 6, Hertfordshire) (Temporary Restriction and Prohibition of Traffic) Order (SI 2011/2776)
- The M27 Motorway (Junction 10, Westbound Exit Slip Road) (Temporary Prohibition of Traffic) Order (SI 2011/2777)
- The A14 Trunk Road (Ipswich Southern Bypass, Junction 54 Sproughton Interchange to Junction 58 Seven Hills Interchange, Suffolk) (Temporary Restriction and Prohibition of Traffic) Order (SI 2011/2778)
- The A11 Trunk Road (Six Mile Bottom to Nine Mile Hill, Cambridgeshire) (Temporary Prohibition of Traffic) Order (SI 2011/2779)
- The A46 Trunk Road (Newark-on-Trent to Lincoln) (Slip Roads) (Temporary Prohibition of Traffic) Order (SI 2011/2780)
- The M5 Motorway (Junctions 26 – 27) (Temporary Prohibition of Traffic) Order (SI 2011/2781)
- The A46 Trunk Road (Birchwood, Lincolnshire) (Temporary Prohibition of Traffic) (No.2) Order (SI 2011/2782)
- The A2 Trunk Road (Bean Junction – Cobham Junction) (Temporary Restriction and Prohibition of Traffic) Order (SI 2011/2783)
- The A5 Trunk Road (Towcester, Northamptonshire) (Footway) (Temporary Prohibition of Traffic) Order (SI 2011/2784)
- The General Teaching Council for England (Disciplinary Functions) (Amendment) Regulations (SI 2011/2785)
- The M4 Motorway (Maes y Gwernen Bridge, West of Junction 45, Ynysforgan, Swansea) (Temporary 50 MPH Speed Limit and Trafficking of Hard Shoulder) Order (SI 2011/2786)
- The A470 Trunk Road (Commins Coch, Powys) (Temporary Prohibition of Vehicles) Order (SI 2011/2787)
- The A5 Trunk Road (Old Stratford to Towcester, Northamptonshire) (Temporary Restriction and Prohibition of Traffic) Order (SI 2011/2788)
- The M6 Motorway (Junction 4) and the A446 Trunk Road (Temporary Prohibition of Traffic) Order (SI 2011/2789)
- The M6 Motorway (Junction 9) (Temporary Prohibition of Traffic) Order (SI 2011/2790)
- The A31 Trunk Road (Poulner Hill Interchange and Picket Post Interchange) (Temporary Prohibition of Traffic) Order (SI 2011/2791)
- The A19 Trunk Road (Silverlink Interchange to Holystone Interchange) (Temporary Restriction and Prohibition of Traffic) Order (SI 2011/2792)
- The M25 Motorway (Junctions 8 – 9) (Temporary Restriction of Traffic) ( 2) Order (SI 2011/2793)
- The A63 Trunk Road (Daltry Street Interchange) (Temporary Prohibition of Traffic) Order (SI 2011/2794)
- The A46 Trunk Road (M40 Junction 15) (Southbound Exit Slip Road) (Temporary Prohibition of Traffic) Order (SI 2011/2795)
- The M6 Motorway (Junctions 42–43 Northbound Carriageway and Junction 42 Northbound Entry Slip Road) (Temporary Prohibition and Restriction of Traffic) Order (SI 2011/2796)
- The A1(M) Motorway (Junction 34 to Junction 35) (Temporary Restriction and Prohibition of Traffic) ( 2) Order (SI 2011/2797)
- The A1 Trunk Road (Highfields Roundabout to the Scottish Border) (Temporary Restriction and Prohibition of Traffic) (No.2) Order (SI 2011/2798)
- The M1 Motorway (Junction 33, Catcliffe) (Temporary Prohibition of Traffic) Order (SI 2011/2799)
- The A3 Trunk Road (Hazel Grove Junction – Thursley Junction) (Temporary Prohibition of Traffic) Order (SI 2011/2800)

== 2801–2900 ==
- The M20 Motorway and the A20 Trunk Road (Roundhill Tunnels) (Temporary Restriction and Prohibition of Traffic) Order (SI 2011/2801)
- The Red Meat Industry (Wales) Measure 2010 (Commencement, Transitional and Saving Provisions Order (SI 2011/2802)
- The Gas Transporter (Modification of Licence Conditions) Regulations (SI 2011/2803)
- The M23 Motorway and the A23 Trunk Road (Junctions 9 – 11) (Temporary Restriction and Prohibition of Traffic) Order (SI 2011/2804)
- The M5 Motorway (Junction 5) (Northbound Entry Slip Road) (Temporary Prohibition of Traffic) Order (SI 2011/2805)
- The M5 Motorway (Junction 1) (Southbound Entry Slip Road) (Temporary Prohibition of Traffic) Order (SI 2011/2806)
- The M42 and M6 Motorways (M42 Junction 8) (Link Road) (Temporary Prohibition of Traffic) (No.2) Order (SI 2011/2807)
- The M6 Motorway (Junction 5) (Southbound Entry Slip Road) (Temporary Prohibition of Traffic) Order (SI 2011/2808)
- The M6 Motorway (Junction 7) (Southbound Exit Slip Road) (Temporary Prohibition of Traffic) (No.2) Order (SI 2011/2809)
- The M4 Motorway (Eastbound Entry Slip Road at Junction 37 (Pyle), Bridgend County Borough) (Temporary Prohibition of Vehicles) Order (SI 2011/2810)
- The A21 Trunk Road (Flimwell – Swiftsden, Hurst Green and Woodmans Green) (Temporary Speed Restrictions) Order (SI 2011/2811)
- The A34 Trunk Road (Marcham Interchange, Southbound Carriageway) (Temporary Prohibition of Traffic) Order (SI 2011/2812)
- The A14 Trunk Road (Spittals Interchange to Alconbury, Cambridgeshire) Lay-bys (Temporary Prohibition of Traffic) Order (SI 2011/2813)
- The A5 Trunk Road (A4146 Kelly's Kitchen Roundabout, Milton Keynes) (Temporary 50 Miles Per Hour Speed Restriction) Order (SI 2011/2814)
- The A47 Trunk Road (Pullover Roundabout to Hardwick Roundabout, King's Lynn, Norfolk) (Temporary Restriction and Prohibition of Traffic) Order (SI 2011/2815)
- The Accession (Immigration and Worker Authorisation) (Amendment) Regulations (SI 2011/2816)
- The A1(M) Motorway (Junction 6, Hertfordshire) Northbound Entry Slip Road (Temporary Prohibition of Traffic) Order (SI 2011/2817)
- The A12 Trunk Road (Junction 18 Sandon Interchange to Junction 19 Boreham Interchange, Chelmsford, Essex) (Temporary Restriction and Prohibition of Traffic) Order (SI 2011/2818)
- The A30 Trunk Road (Temple, Near Bodmin) (Temporary Prohibition and Restriction of Traffic) Order (SI 2011/2819)
- The A52 Trunk Road (Derby Road, Nottingham) (Bus/Cycle Lane) Order 2002 Variation Order (SI 2011/2820)
- The A52 Trunk Road (Queens Medical Centre Roundabout, Nottingham) (Bus Lane) (Experimental) Order (SI 2011/2821)
- The A590 Trunk Road (Barr End Rockface, Greenodd) (Temporary Prohibition and Restriction of Traffic) ( 2) Order (SI 2011/2822)
- The M61 Motorway (Junction 6 Southbound Dedicated Exit Slip Road) (Temporary Prohibition of Traffic) Order (SI 2011/2823)
- The A1 Trunk Road (Swalwell Interchange) (Temporary Prohibition of Traffic) Order (SI 2011/2824)
- The A1(M) Motorway (Junction 60 to Junction 63) and the A690 Trunk Road (Temporary Restriction and Prohibition of Traffic) Order (SI 2011/2825)
- The A2 Trunk Road (Upper Harbledown – Guston) (Temporary Restriction and Prohibition of Traffic) Order (SI 2011/2826)
- The A421 Trunk Road (M1 Junction 13 to Marsh Leys Junction, Bedfordshire) (Temporary Prohibition of Traffic) Order (SI 2011/2827)
- The M11 Motorway (Junctions 7 to 8, Essex) (Temporary Restriction and Prohibition of Traffic) Order (SI 2011/2828)
- The Incidental Flooding and Coastal Erosion (Wales) Order (SI 2011/2829)
- The Pigs (Records, Identification and Movement) (Wales) Order (SI 2011/2830)
- The Agricultural Holdings (Units of Production) (Wales) Order (SI 2011/2831)
- The Financial Services and Markets Act 2000 (Permissions, Transitional Provisions and Consequential Amendments) (Northern Ireland Credit Unions) Order (SI 2011/2832)
- The Money Laundering (Amendment No.2) Regulations (SI 2011/2833)
- The Police Reform and Social Responsibility Act 2011 (Commencement 2) Order (SI 2011/2834)
- The Terrorist Asset-Freezing etc. Act 2010 (Commencement) Order (SI 2011/2835)
- The A30 and A35 Trunk Roads (Honiton to Bridport) (Temporary Prohibition and Restriction of Traffic) Order (SI 2011/2836)
- The A2070 Trunk Road (A2042 Junction, Slip Roads) (Temporary Prohibition of Traffic) Order (SI 2011/2837)
- The A38 Trunk Road (Lower Dean Junction to Marley Head Junction, Near Buckfastleigh) (Temporary Prohibition and Restriction of Traffic) Order (SI 2011/2838)
- The A470 Trunk Road (Carno, Powys) (Temporary Traffic Restrictions & Prohibitions) Order (SI 2011/2839)
- The Tribunal Procedure (Amendment) (No.2) Rules (SI 2011/2840)
- The First-tier Tribunal (Immigration and Asylum Chamber) Fees Order (SI 2011/2841)
- The Carers Strategies (Wales) Measure 2010 (Commencement) Order (SI 2011/2842)
- The M5 Motorway (Junctions 9–10) (Temporary Prohibition and Restriction of Traffic) Order (SI 2011/2843)
- The A168 Trunk Road (Dishforth Interchange) (Temporary 50 Miles Per Hour Speed Restriction) Order (SI 2011/2844)
- The A43 Trunk Road and M40 Motorway (Junction 10) (Oxfordshire and Northamptonshire) (Temporary Restriction and Prohibition of Traffic) Order (SI 2011/2845)
- The M6 and M69 Motorways (M6 Junction 2) (Temporary Prohibition of Traffic) Order (SI 2011/2846)
- The A5 Trunk Road (Felton Butler, Shropshire) (Temporary Restriction and Prohibition of Traffic) Order (SI 2011/2847)
- The A52 Trunk Road (B679 – A52 Link Road) (Nottingham) (Temporary Prohibition of Traffic) Order (SI 2011/2848)
- The A52 Trunk Road (Holme House Junction, Nottinghamshire) Temporary Prohibition of Traffic) Order (SI 2011/2849)
- The A12 Trunk Road (Ingatestone Bypass, Trueloves Interchange, Essex) Southbound (Temporary Restriction and Prohibition of Traffic) Order (SI 2011/2850)
- The A47 Trunk Road (Trowse Interchange, Norwich, Norfolk) Westbound (Temporary Restriction and Prohibition of Traffic) Order (SI 2011/2851)
- The M4 Motorway (Junctions 5 – 6) (Temporary Restriction and Prohibition of Traffic) Order (SI 2011/2852)
- The A1 Trunk Road (Dry Doddington, Lincolnshire) Temporary Prohibition of Traffic) Order (SI 2011/2853)
- The M6 Motorway (Junctions 35–41 Northbound and Southbound Carriageways) (Temporary Restriction of Traffic) Order (SI 2011/2854)
- The Incidental Flooding and Coastal Erosion (England) Order (SI 2011/2855)
- The Flood and Water Management Act 2010 (Commencement 5 and Transitional Provisions) Order (SI 2011/2856)
- The Welfare Reform Act 2009 (Commencement 6) Order (SI 2011/2857)
- The M5 Motorway (M6 Junction 8, Birmingham) (Temporary Prohibition of Traffic) Order (SI 2011/2858)
- The Regulated Covered Bonds (Amendment) Regulations (SI 2011/2859)
- The Renewable Heat Incentive Scheme Regulations (SI 2011/2860)
- The Black Country (Coroner's District) Order (SI 2011/2861)
- The Social Security (Contribution Conditions for Jobseeker's Allowance and Employment and Support Allowance) Regulations (SI 2011/2862)
- The Legal Services Act 2007 (Appeals from Licensing Authority Decisions) (No.2) Order (SI 2011/2863)
- The M6 Toll (Slip Roads) (Temporary Prohibition of Traffic) (No.2) Order (SI 2011/2864)
- The Rehabilitation of Offenders Act 1974 (Exceptions) (Amendment) (England and Wales) (No.2) Order (SI 2011/2865)
- The Legal Services Act 2007 (Designation as a Licensing Authority) ( 2) Order (SI 2011/2866)
- The Occupational Pensions (Revaluation) Order (SI 2011/2867)
- The Civil Enforcement of Parking Contraventions (County Borough of Merthyr Tydfil) Designation Order (SI 2011/2868)
- The Safety of Sports Grounds (Designation) (No.5) Order (SI 2011/2869)
- The M1 Motorway (Junction 39) (Temporary Restriction and Prohibition of Traffic) Order (SI 2011/2870)
- The M6 and M6 Toll Motorways (Coleshill, Warwickshire) (Temporary Prohibition of Traffic) Order (SI 2011/2871)
- The A46 Trunk Road (West of Stratford-upon-Avon, Warwickshire) (Temporary Restriction and Prohibition of Traffic) (No.3) Order (SI 2011/2872)
- The Artist's Resale Right (Amendment) Regulations (SI 2011/2873)
- The M1 Motorway (Junction 35A to Junction 36) (Temporary Restriction and Prohibition of Traffic) (No.2) Order (SI 2011/2874)
- The A19 Trunk Road (Lindisfarne to Tyne Tunnel) (50 Miles Per Hour and 30 Miles Per Hour Speed Restriction) Order (SI 2011/2875)
- The A34 Trunk Road (M3 Junction 9 – M40 Junction 9, Lay-Bys) (Temporary Prohibition of Traffic) Order (SI 2011/2876)
- The A2 Trunk Road (Upper Harbledown – Whitfield, Slip Roads) (Temporary Prohibition of Traffic) Order (SI 2011/2877)
- The Statistics and Registration Service Act 2007 (Disclosure of Value Added Tax Information) Regulations (SI 2011/2878)
- The M5 Motorway (Junctions 11A-12) (Temporary Restriction of Traffic) (Number 3) Order (SI 2011/2879)
- The Flood Risk (Amendment) (Wales) Regulations (SI 2011/2880)
- The M5 Motorway (Junction 28 Southbound Exit Slip Road) (Temporary Prohibition of Traffic) Order (SI 2011/2881)
- The M5 Motorway (Junction 29 Slip Roads) (Temporary Prohibition of Traffic) Order (SI 2011/2882)
- The Non-Commercial Movement of Pet Animals Order (SI 2011/2883)
- The Central Office of Information Trading Fund (Revocation) Order (SI 2011/2884)
- The Corporation Tax (Variation of the Relevant Percentage) Order (SI 2011/2885)
- The Competition Act 1998 (Public Policy Exclusion) (Revocation) Order (SI 2011/2886)
- The A470 Trunk Road (Junction 32, Coryton Interchange, Cardiff) (40 mph Speed Limit) Order (SI 2011/2887)
- The A1 Trunk Road (Stotfold to Biggleswade, Bedfordshire) (Temporary Restriction and Prohibition of Traffic) Order (SI 2011/2888)
- The A1 Trunk Road (Chesterton, Cambridgeshire) Northbound Slip Roads (Temporary Prohibition of Traffic) Order (SI 2011/2889)
- The A419 Trunk Road (B4040 Swindon Road and Cricklade Roundabout) (Detrunking) Order (SI 2011/2890)
- The M5 Motorway (Junction 28 Southbound Exit Slip Road) (Temporary Prohibition of Traffic) Order (SI 2011/2891)
- The M6 Motorway (Junction 33, Southbound Exit Slip Road) (Temporary Prohibition of Traffic) Order (SI 2011/2892)
- The M1 Motorway (Junction 38) (Temporary Restriction and Prohibition of Traffic) Order (SI 2011/2893)
- The A1 Trunk Road (Felton to Alnwick) (Temporary Restriction and Prohibition of Traffic) Order (SI 2011/2894)
- The A1 Trunk Road (Dunston Interchange) (Temporary Prohibition of Traffic) ( 3) Order (SI 2011/2895)
- The Localism Act 2011 (Commencement 1 and Transitional Provisions) Order (SI 2011/2896)
- The A1 Trunk Road (Seaton Burn Interchange) (Temporary Restriction and Prohibition of Traffic) Order (SI 2011/2897)
- The London Olympic Games and Paralympic Games (Advertising and Trading) (England) Regulations (SI 2011/2898)
- The M42 Motorway (Junction 5 – Junction 6) (Temporary Prohibition of Traffic) Order (SI 2011/2899)
- The A46 Trunk Road and the M6 and M69 Motorways (M6 Junction 2, Warwickshire) (Temporary Prohibition of Traffic) Order (SI 2011/2900)

== 2901–3000 ==
- The A52 Trunk Road (Nottingham) (Slip Roads) (Temporary Prohibition of Traffic) Order (SI 2011/2901)
- The A500 Trunk Road (Hanford, Stoke-on-Trent, Staffordshire) (Temporary Prohibition of Traffic in Layby) (No.2) Order (SI 2011/2902)
- The A5 Trunk Road (Towcester to Weedon, Northamptonshire) (Temporary Restriction and Prohibition of Traffic) Order (SI 2011/2903)
- The Excise Duties (Surcharges or Rebates) (Hydrocarbon Oils etc.) Order (SI 2011/2904)
- The Excise Duties (Road Fuel Gas) (Reliefs) Regulations (SI 2011/2905)
- The National Health Service (Charges to Overseas Visitors) (Amendment) (Wales) Regulations (SI 2011/2906)
- The National Health Service (Pharmaceutical Services) (Amendment) (Wales) Regulations (SI 2011/2907)
- The General Teaching Council for Wales (Disciplinary Functions) (Amendment) Regulations (SI 2011/2908)
- The Smoke Control Areas (Authorised Fuels) (Wales) (Amendment) Regulations (SI 2011/2909)
- The Tax Credits Act 2002 (Further Commencement and Transitional Provisions) Order (SI 2011/2910)
- The Greenhouse Gas Emissions Trading Scheme (Amendment) (Registries and Fees etc.) Regulations (SI 2011/2911)
- The Loan Relationships and Derivative Contracts (Disregard and Bringing into Account of Profits and Losses) (Amendment 2) Regulations (SI 2011/2912)
- The Estates of Deceased Persons (Forfeiture Rule and Law of Succession) Act 2011 (Commencement) Order (SI 2011/2913)
- The Local Authorities (Referendums)(Petitions)(England) Regulations (SI 2011/2914)
- The M42 Motorway (Junction 7a) (Temporary Prohibition of Traffic) Order (SI 2011/2915)
- The M6 Motorway (Junction 10) (Northbound Entry Slip Road) (Temporary Prohibition of Traffic) (No.2) Order (SI 2011/2916)
- The Private Security Industry Act 2001 Regulations (Amendment) Regulations (SI 2011/2917)
- The Local Authorities (Contracting Out of Community Infrastructure Levy Functions) Order (SI 2011/2918)
- The A49 Trunk Road (Wilton to South of Harewood End, Herefordshire) (Temporary Restriction and Prohibition of Traffic) Order (SI 2011/2919)
- The A46 Trunk Road (Binley, Coventry) (Temporary Restriction of Traffic) (No.2) Order (SI 2011/2920)
- The A49 Trunk Road (Edgar Street, Hereford) (Footway) (Temporary Prohibition of Traffic) Order (SI 2011/2921)
- The River Tyne (Tunnels) (Revision of Tolls) Order (SI 2011/2922)
- The Trading with the Enemy (Revocation) Order (SI 2011/2923)
- The M1 Motorway (Junctions 20 to 21) (Temporary Prohibition of Traffic) Order (SI 2011/2924)
- The Export Control (Sudan and South Sudan Sanctions) and (Miscellaneous Amendments) Regulations (SI 2011/2925)
- The Income Tax (Indexation) Order (SI 2011/2926)
- The Statistics and Registration Service Act 2007 (Disclosure of Pupil Information by Welsh Ministers) Regulations (SI 2011/2927)
- The Financial Services and Markets Act 2000 (Market Abuse) Regulations (SI 2011/2928)
- The A23 Trunk Road (Warninglid Interchange – Hickstead Interchange, Slip Roads) (Temporary Prohibition of Traffic) Order (SI 2011/2929)
- The Immigration (Designation of Travel Bans) (Amendment 7) Order (SI 2011/2930)
- The MARD Regulations (SI 2011/2931)
- The Swansea (Communities) Order (SI 2011/2932)
- The Environmental Permitting (England and Wales) (Amendment) ( 2) Regulations (SI 2011/2933)
- The Finance Act 2011, Section 88 (Appointed Day) Order (SI 2011/2934)
- The Hydrocarbon Oil and Biofuels (Road Fuel in Defined Areas) (Reliefs) Regulations (SI 2011/2935)
- The Wine Regulations (SI 2011/2936)
- The Renewable Transport Fuel Obligations (Amendment) Order (SI 2011/2937)
- The Traffic Management Act 2004 (Commencement 5 and Transitional Provisions) (England) (Amendment) Order (SI 2011/2938)
- The Carers Strategies (Wales) Regulations (SI 2011/2939)
- The School Teacher Appraisal (Wales) Regulations (SI 2011/2940)
- The Common Agricultural Policy Single Payment and Support Schemes (Cross Compliance) (Wales) (Amendment) Regulations (SI 2011/2941)
- The Mental Health (Care Co-ordination and Care and Treatment Planning) (Wales) Regulations (SI 2011/2942)
- The Social Security (Electronic Communications) ( 2) Order (SI 2011/2943)
- The Protection of the Euro against Counterfeiting (Amendment) Regulations (SI 2011/2944)
- The Charges for Residues Surveillance (Amendment) Regulations (SI 2011/2945)
- The Red Meat Industry (Wales) Measure 2010 (Amendment) Order (SI 2011/2946)
- The Parole Board Rules (SI 2011/2947)
- The Health and Social Care Act 2008 (Primary Dental Services, Private Ambulance Services and Primary Medical Services) (Regulated Activities) (Transitory and Transitional Provisions) (Amendment) Order (SI 2011/2948)
- The Wireless Telegraphy (Intelligent Transport Systems) (Exemption) Regulations (SI 2011/2949)
- The Wireless Telegraphy (Exemption) (Amendment) Regulations (SI 2011/2950)
- The Investment Trusts (Dividends) (Optional Treatment as Interest Distributions) (Amendment) Regulations (SI 2011/2951)
- The M3 Motorway and the A316 Trunk Road (Junction 1, Slip Roads) (Temporary Prohibition of Traffic) Order (SI 2011/2952)
- The Social Security Pensions (Flat Rate Introduction Year) Order (SI 2011/2953)
- The Local Government (Discretionary Payments) (Injury Allowances) Regulations (SI 2011/2954)
- The Health Service Branded Medicines (Control of Prices and Supply of Information) Amendment Regulations (SI 2011/2955)
- The A3 Trunk Road (Esher – Ockham) (Temporary Prohibition of Traffic) Order (SI 2011/2956)
- The Income-related Benefits (Subsidy to Authorities) Amendment Order (SI 2011/2957)
- The A27 Trunk Road (Warblington Interchange – Falmer Interchange, Slip Roads) (Temporary Prohibition of Traffic) Order (SI 2011/2958)
- The Winchester and Eastleigh Healthcare National Health Service Trust (Dissolution) Order (SI 2011/2959)
- The M25 Motorway (Junctions 6 – 10, Slip Roads) (Temporary Prohibition of Traffic) Order (SI 2011/2960)
- The Suffolk Mental Health Partnership National Health Service Trust (Dissolution) Order (SI 2011/2961)
- The NHS Foundation Trusts (Trust Funds: Appointment of Trustees) Amendment Order (SI 2011/2962)
- The M25 Motorway (Bell Common Tunnel) (Temporary Restriction and Prohibition of Traffic) Order (SI 2011/2963)
- The A23 Trunk Road and the A27 Trunk Road (Patcham Junction, Link Roads) (Temporary Prohibition of Traffic) Order (SI 2011/2964)
- The A20 Trunk Road (Alkham Valley Interchange and Courtwood Interchange, Slip Roads) (Temporary Prohibition of Traffic) Order (SI 2011/2965)
- The A23 Trunk Road and the M23 Motorway (Junctions 9 – 11, Slip Roads) (Temporary Prohibition of Traffic) Order (SI 2011/2966)
- The M4 Motorway (Junctions 16–17) (Temporary Restriction of Traffic) (Number 2) Order (SI 2011/2967)
- The A38 Trunk Road (Alrewas to Barton-under-Needwood, Staffordshire) (Temporary Prohibition of Traffic) Order (SI 2011/2968)
- The M50 Motorway (Junctions 1 – 2, Near Tewkesbury) (Temporary Restriction and Prohibition of Traffic) Order (SI 2011/2969)
- The Civil Procedure (Amendment 3) Rules (SI 2011/2970)
- The Community Legal Service (Financial) (Amendment 2) Regulations (SI 2011/2971)
- The General Chiropractic Council (Registration) (Amendment and Repayment) Rules Order of Council (SI 2011/2972)
- The Occupational Pension Schemes (Employer Debt and Miscellaneous Amendments) Regulations (SI 2011/2973)
- The South Gloucestershire and Stroud College (Incorporation) Order (SI 2011/2974)
- The South Gloucestershire and Stroud College (Government) Regulations (SI 2011/2975)
- The Eels (England and Wales) (Amendment) Regulations (SI 2011/2976)
- The Finance Act 2011, Section 49(6) (Appointed Day) Order (SI 2011/2977)
- The Merchant Shipping (Safety of Navigation) (Amendment) Regulations (SI 2011/2978)
- The Overseas Territories (Change of Name) ( 6) Order (SI 2011/2979)
- The Overseas Territories (Change of Name) ( 7) Order (SI 2011/2980)
- The Overseas Territories (Change of Name) ( 8) Order (SI 2011/2981)
- The Overseas Territories (Change of Name) ( 9) Order (SI 2011/2982)
- The Overseas Territories (Change of Name) ( 10) Order (SI 2011/2983)
- The Overseas Territories (Change of Name) ( 11) Order (SI 2011/2984)
- The Iran (United Nations Sanctions) (Amendment) Order (SI 2011/2985)
- The Parliamentary Commissioner ( 2) Order (SI 2011/2986)
- The Parliamentary Constituencies and Assembly Electoral Regions (Wales) (Amendment) Order (SI 2011/2987)
- The Belarus (Restrictive Measures) (Overseas Territories) (Amendment) Order (SI 2011/2988)
- The Iran (Restrictive Measures) (Overseas Territories) Order (SI 2011/2989)
- The International Criminal Tribunal for the former Yugoslavia (Restrictive Measures) (Overseas Territories) (Revocation) Order (SI 2011/2990)
- The Trading with the Enemy (Revocation) Order in Council (SI 2011/2991)
- The Seed Marketing (Amendment) Regulations (SI 2011/2992)
- The Non-Domestic Rating Contributions (England) (Amendment) Regulations (SI 2011/2993)
- The M42 Motorway (Junction 3) (Northbound Entry Slip Road) (Temporary Prohibition of Traffic) Order (SI 2011/2994)
- The M6 Motorway (Junction 4) (Link Road) (Temporary Prohibition of Traffic) Order (SI 2011/2995)
- The M6 Motorway (Junctions 16–19 Northbound and Southbound Carriageways and Junction 18 Northbound Entry and Southbound Exit Slip Roads) (Temporary Prohibition and Restriction of Traffic) Order (SI 2011/2996)
- The M6 Motorway (Junction 19, Northbound and Southbound Exit and Entry Slip Roads) (Temporary Prohibition of Traffic) Order (SI 2011/2997)
- The A419 Trunk Road (Commonhead Roundabout, Swindon) (Temporary Prohibition of Traffic) (Number 2) Order (SI 2011/2998)
- The Investment Trust (Approved Company) (Tax) Regulations (SI 2011/2999)
- The A34 Trunk Road (M6 Junction 14, Stafford) (Slip Road) (Temporary Prohibition of Traffic) Order (SI 2011/3000)

== 3001–3100 ==
- The Post Office Limited (Designation) Order (SI 2011/3001)
- The Code of Practice for Electronic Programme Guides (Addition of Programme Services) Order (SI 2011/3003)
- The Government Resources and Accounts Act 2000 (Estimates and Accounts) (Amendment) Order (SI 2011/3004)
- The M25 Motorway and the A282 Trunk Road (Dartford – Thurrock Crossing) (Temporary Restriction and Prohibition of Traffic) Order (SI 2011/3005)
- The Employment Rights (Increase of Limits) Order (SI 2011/3006)
- The A23 Trunk Road (Slaugham Junction – Hickstead Interchange) (Temporary Restriction and Prohibition of Traffic) Order (SI 2011/3007)
- The A259 Trunk Road (Winchelsea – Rye) (Temporary Speed Restrictions) Order (SI 2011/3008)
- The Designation of Schools Having a Religious Character (Independent Schools) (England) ( 5) Order (SI 2011/3009)
- The A27 Trunk Road and the M27 Motorway (Broadmarsh Interchange – M27 Junction 12) (Temporary Restriction and Prohibition of Traffic) Order (SI 2011/3010)
- The A49 Trunk Road (Bridstow, Herefordshire) (40 Miles Per Hour and 50 Miles Per Hour Speed Limit) Order (SI 2011/3011)
- The Transfer of Functions (Food) Regulations (SI 2011/3012)
- The Armed Forces Redundancy Scheme 2006, the Armed Forces Redundancy Etc. Schemes 2010 and the Armed Forces Pension Scheme 2005 (Amendment) Order (SI 2011/3013)
- The Water Supply (Amendment to the Threshold Requirement) Regulations (SI 2011/3014)
- The Finance Act 2011 (Bank Levy: Amendment of Netting Agreements Provisions) Order (SI 2011/3015)
- The Crime and Security Act 2010 (Commencement 4) Order (SI 2011/3016)
- The A27 Trunk Road (Hoe Court Junction – Adur Interchange) (Temporary Restriction and Prohibition of Traffic) Order (SI 2011/3017)
- The A259 Trunk Road (Fishmarket Road – North of Guldeford Level Crossing) (Temporary Restriction and Prohibition of Traffic) Order (SI 2011/3018)
- The Police Reform and Social Responsibility Act 2011 (Commencement 3 and Transitional Provisions) Order (SI 2011/3019)
- The M6 Motorway (Junction 15 to Junction 16) (Temporary Prohibition of Traffic) Order (SI 2011/3020)
- The M4 Motorway (West of Junction 12, Westbound) (Temporary Restriction of Traffic) Order (SI 2011/3022)
- The A27 Trunk Road (Cop Hall Roundabout, Dedicated Link Road) (Temporary Prohibition of Traffic) Order (SI 2011/3023)
- The A249 Trunk Road (Key Street – Cowstead Roundabout) (Temporary Prohibition of Traffic) Order (SI 2011/3024)
- The M60 Motorway (Junctions 5-3 Anticlockwise Carriageway and Slip Roads) and the M56 (Sharston Link) (Eastbound Carriageway and Junction 2 Slip Road) (Temporary Prohibition and Restriction of Traffic) Order (SI 2011/3025)
- The Police (Amendment) Regulations (SI 2011/3026)
- The Police (Performance and Conduct) (Amendment: Metropolitan Police) Regulations (SI 2011/3027)
- The Police (Complaints and Misconduct) (Amendment: Metropolitan Police) Regulations (SI 2011/3028)
- The Police Appeals Tribunals (Amendment: Metropolitan Police) Rules (SI 2011/3029)
- The A46 and A52 Trunk Roads (Widmerpool to Newark-on-Trent) (Temporary Restriction and Prohibition of Traffic) ( 2) Order (SI 2011/3030)
- The A50 Trunk Road (Longton, Stoke-on-Trent) (Temporary Prohibition of Traffic) Order (SI 2011/3031)
- The Portsmouth (Continental Ferry Port Berth 2 Extension) Harbour Revision Order (SI 2011/3032)
- The Pensions Act 2008 (Commencement No.11) Order (SI 2011/3033)
- The Pensions Act 2011 (Commencement 1) Order (SI 2011/3034)
- The Wireless Telegraphy (Exemption and Amendment) (Amendment) Regulations (SI 2011/3035)
- The Postal Packets (Revenue and Customs) Regulations (SI 2011/3036)
- The Cosmetic Products (Safety) (Amendment) Regulations (SI 2011/3037)
- The Council Tax (Demand Notices) (England) Regulations (SI 2011/3038)
- The Hallmarking (International Convention) (Amendment) Order (SI 2011/3039)
- The River Tyne (Tunnels) (Modification) Order (SI 2011/3040)
- The Traffic Signs (Amendment) ( 2) Regulations and General Directions (SI 2011/3041)
- The Landfill Allowances Scheme (Wales) (Amendment) ( 2) Regulations (SI 2011/3042)
- The Public Bodies Act 2011 (Commencement 1) Order (SI 2011/3043)
- The Postal Services Act 2011 (Commencement 2) Order (SI 2011/3044)
- The Port Security (Port of Dover) Designation Order (SI 2011/3045)
- The Mental Health (Wales) Measure 2010 (Commencement No.1 and Transitional Provision) Order (SI 2011/3046)
- The Public Health Wales National Health Service Trust (Originating Capital) (Wales) Order (SI 2011/3047)
- The Members of the European Parliament (Salaries of Members of the Greater London Authority) Order (SI 2011/3048)
- The Open-Ended Investment Companies (Amendment) Regulations (SI 2011/3049)
- The Elected Local Policing Bodies (Specified Information) Order (SI 2011/3050)
- The A45 Trunk Road (South of Coventry) (Temporary Prohibition and Restriction of Traffic) Order (SI 2011/3051)
- The M4 Motorway (Junction 10, Link Roads) (Temporary Prohibition of Traffic) ( 2) Order (SI 2011/3052)
- The A282 Trunk Road (Junctions 1A & 1B, Slip Roads) (Temporary Prohibition of Traffic) Order (SI 2011/3053)
- The M4 Motorway (Junction 7, Slip and Spur Roads) (Temporary Prohibition of Traffic) ( 2) Order (SI 2011/3054)
- The M2 Motorway (Junction 7, Exit Slip Road) (Temporary Prohibition of Traffic) Order (SI 2011/3055)
- The Merchant Shipping (Ship Inspection and Survey Organisations) (Revocation) Regulations (SI 2011/3056)
- The Education (National Curriculum) (Key Stage 1 Assessment Arrangements) (England) (Amendment) Order (SI 2011/3057)
- The Local Policing Bodies (Consequential Amendments) Regulations (SI 2011/3058)
- The South East Water Ltd (River Ouse, Barcombe) Drought Order (SI 2011/3059)
- The Severn Bridges Tolls Order (SI 2011/3060)
- The Revenue and Customs (Complaints and Misconduct) (Amendment) Regulations (SI 2011/3061)
- The Electricity and Gas (Carbon Emissions and Community Energy Saving) (Amendment) Order (SI 2011/3062)
- The Police Pensions (Amendment) Regulations (SI 2011/3063)
- The Excise Duties (Road Fuel Gas) (Reliefs) ( 2) Regulations (SI 2011/3064)
- The Road Vehicles (Construction and Use) (Amendment 2) Regulations (SI 2011/3065)
- The Railways (Interoperability) Regulations (SI 2011/3066)
- The A34 Trunk Road (Botley Interchange, Southbound Entry Slip Road) (Temporary Prohibition of Traffic) Order (SI 2011/3067)
- The A3 Trunk Road (Esher Common – Cobham, Southbound) (Temporary Restriction of Traffic) Order (SI 2011/3068)
- The A46 Trunk Road (Evesham, Worcestershire) (Temporary Restriction and Prohibition of Traffic) Order (SI 2011/3069)
- The Solicitors Disciplinary Tribunal (Appeals) (Amendment) Rules (SI 2011/3070)
- The M4 Motorway (Junctions 11 and 12) (Temporary Restriction and Prohibition of Traffic) Order (SI 2011/3071)
- The M25 and the M3 Motorways (Thorpe Interchange, Link Roads) (Temporary Prohibition of Traffic) Order (SI 2011/3072)
- The A2 Trunk Road (Honeywood Interchange – Eastern Docks Roundabout) (Temporary Restriction and Prohibition of Traffic) Order (SI 2011/3073)
- The A3 Trunk Road (Esher Common Junction, Northbound Exit Slip Road) (Temporary Prohibition of Traffic) Order (SI 2011/3074)
- The Criminal Procedure (Amendment) Rules (SI 2011/3075)
- The Dartmouth-Kingswear Floating Bridge (Vehicle Classifications & Revision of Charges) (Amendment) Order (SI 2011/3076)
- The A259 Trunk Road (Kettle O?Fish Roundabout — Fishmarket Road Roundabout) (Temporary Prohibition of Traffic) Order (SI 2011/3077)
- The A27 Trunk Road (Causeway Roundabout — East of Crossbush Interchange) (Temporary Restriction and Prohibition of Traffic) Order (SI 2011/3078)
- The A2 Trunk Road (Darenth Interchange and Bean Junction) (Temporary Prohibition of Traffic) Order (SI 2011/3079)
- The A23 Trunk Road and the M23 Motorway (M23 Junction 11 – Hickstead Interchange) (Temporary Restriction and Prohibition of Traffic) Order (SI 2011/3080)
- The A616 Trunk Road (Wortley Junction to Newton Chambers Roundabout) (Temporary Prohibition of Traffic) Order 2011 Amendment Order (SI 2011/3081)
- The M53 Motorway (Junction 2 Southbound Exit Slip Road) (Moreton Spur)(Temporary Restriction of Traffic) Order 2011 Amendment Order (SI 2011/3082)
- The M53 Motorway (Junctions 12-4 Northbound and Southbound Carriageways and Slip Roads) and M56 (Junction 15 Link Roads) (Temporary Prohibition and Restriction of Traffic) Order (SI 2011/3083)
- The M60, M66, M56, M6, M65, M53 and M61 Motorways (Various Slip Road Closures) (Temporary Prohibition of Traffic) Order (SI 2011/3084)
- The A419 Trunk Road (Kingshill and Lower Widhill Farm Junctions, Near Cricklade, Wiltshire) (Temporary Prohibition of Traffic) Order (SI 2011/3085)
- The A30 Trunk Road (Fingle Glen Junction to Alphington Junction, Exeter) (Temporary Prohibition and Restriction of Traffic) Order (SI 2011/3086)
- The A38 Trunk Road (Drybridge Junction to Marley Head Junction, Near South Brent) (Temporary Prohibition and Restriction of Traffic) (Number 2) Order (SI 2011/3087)
- The A303 Trunk Road (Cartgate Roundabout, Near Martock) (Temporary Restriction and Prohibition of Traffic) Order (SI 2011/3088)
- The M5 Motorway (Junction 24) (Temporary Prohibition and Restriction of Traffic) Order (SI 2011/3089)
- The M61 Motorway (Junction 1 Southbound Link Road to the M60 Anticlockwise) (Temporary Prohibition of Traffic) Order (SI 2011/3090)
- The A5 Trunk Road (Atherstone, Warwickshire) (Derestriction) Order 2007 Variation Order (SI 2011/3091)
- The A449 Trunk Road (Coven Heath to Gailey, Staffordshire) (Derestriction) Order (SI 2011/3092)
- The Trunk Road (A5 Watling Street Grendon) (50 MPH Speed Limit) Order 1989 Revocation Order (SI 2011/3093)
- The A30 and A303 Trunk Roads (Honiton to Rawridge Hill, Devon) (Temporary Prohibition and Restriction of Traffic) Order (SI 2011/3094)
- The A38 Trunk Road (Weston Interchange, Liskeard) (Temporary Prohibition of Traffic) Order (SI 2011/3095)
- The A1 Trunk Road (Fenwick Junction to Haggerston Junction) (Temporary Restriction and Prohibition of Traffic) Order (SI 2011/3096)
- The A57 Trunk Road and the A628 Trunk Road (Gunn Inn Junction) (Temporary Prohibition of Traffic) Order (SI 2011/3097)
- The M1 Motorway and the M18 Motorway (Thurcroft Interchange) (Temporary Restriction and Prohibition of Traffic) Order (SI 2011/3098)
- The A38 Trunk Road (Dobwalls to Bodmin) (Temporary Prohibition and Restriction of Traffic) Order (SI 2011/3099)
- The A66 Trunk Road (Morton Palms Roundabout to Little Burdon Roundabout) (Temporary Prohibition of Traffic) Order (SI 2011/3100)

== 3101–3200 ==
- The A465 Trunk Road (In the Vicinity of Cefn Coed Roundabout, Merthyr Tydfil County Borough) (Temporary Prohibition of Vehicles & Cyclists) Order (SI 2011/3101)
- The Northwood Headquarters Byelaws (SI 2011/3102)
- The Civil Procedure (Amendment No.4) Rules (SI 2011/3103)
- The A303 Trunk Road (Amesbury to Wylye) (Temporary Prohibition and Restriction of Traffic) Order (SI 2011/3104)
- The M5 Motorway (Junctions 13–14) (Temporary Restriction and Prohibition of Traffic) Order (SI 2011/3105)
- The A38 Trunk Road (South Brent to Ivybridge, Devon) (Temporary Prohibition of Traffic) (Number 2) Order (SI 2011/3106)
- The A36 Trunk Road (Bathampton to Beckington) (Temporary Prohibition of Traffic) Order (SI 2011/3107)
- The A38 Trunk Road (Plympton to Ivybridge) (Temporary Prohibition and Restriction of Traffic) Order (SI 2011/3108)
- The A47 Trunk Road (Acle Roundabout to Vauxhall Roundabout, Great Yarmouth, Norfolk) (Temporary Prohibition of Traffic) Order (SI 2011/3109)
- The A11 Trunk Road (Thetford, Norfolk) Northbound (Temporary Prohibition of Traffic) Order (SI 2011/3110)
- The A12 Trunk Road (Junction 17 Howe Green Interchange, Chelmsford, Essex) Northbound (Temporary Restriction and Prohibition of Traffic) Order (SI 2011/3111)
- The M5 Motorway (Junctions 29–30) (Temporary Prohibition and Restriction of Traffic) Order (SI 2011/3112)
- The A5 Trunk Road (A4146 Kelly's Kitchen Roundabout to A422 Monks Way Roundabout, Milton Keynes) (Temporary Restriction and Prohibition of Traffic) Order (SI 2011/3113)
- The M1 Motorway (Junction 25) (Southbound Entry Slip Road) (Temporary Prohibition of Traffic) Order (SI 2011/3114)
- The A14 Trunk Road Junction 1(Northamptonshire) (Temporary Prohibition of Traffic) Order (SI 2011/3115)
- The A50 Trunk Road (A50/A38 Toyota Interchange, Derbyshire) (Slip Road) (Temporary Prohibition of Traffic) Order (SI 2011/3116)
- The M4 Motorway, the M5 Motorway, the M48 Motorway and the M32 Motorway (Temporary Restriction and Prohibition of Traffic) Order (SI 2011/3117)
- The M6 and M42 Motorways (M6 Junction 4 and M42 Junction 7a) (Temporary Prohibition of Traffic) Order (SI 2011/3118)
- The M42 Motorway (Junction 4 – Junction 3a) (Temporary Prohibition of Traffic) Order (SI 2011/3119)
- The A38 Trunk Road (Cappers Lane to Swinfen, Staffordshire) (Temporary Prohibition of Traffic) Order (SI 2011/3120)
- The M69 and M6 Motorways (M6 Junction 2) (Temporary Prohibition of Traffic) Order (SI 2011/3121)
- The A1 Trunk Road (Denton Burn Interchange) (Temporary Restriction and Prohibition of Traffic) Order (SI 2011/3122)
- The A1(M) Motorway (Junction 56, Barton) (Temporary Restriction and Prohibition of Traffic) ( 2) Order (SI 2011/3123)
- The A1 Trunk Road (North of A1(M) Junction 10, Bedfordshire to Alconbury, Cambridgeshire) (Temporary Restriction and Prohibition of Traffic and Pedestrians) Order (SI 2011/3124)
- The M42 Motorway (Junctions 1 to 3a) (Temporary Restriction and Prohibition of Traffic) (No.2) Order (SI 2011/3125)
- The M61 Motorway (Kearsley Spur Southbound Carriageway and Southbound Entry Slip Road from the A666) (Temporary Prohibition and Restriction of Traffic) Order (SI 2011/3126)
- The A590 Trunk Road (Roam Bridge Layby Improvement Scheme) (Temporary Prohibition of Traffic) Order (SI 2011/3127)
- The A46 Trunk Road (Winthorpe, Newark-on-Trent, Nottinghamshire) (Temporary Prohibition of Traffic) Order (SI 2011/3128)
- The A45 Trunk Road (Northampton) (Temporary Prohibition of Traffic) Order (SI 2011/3129)
- The A52 Trunk Road (M1 Junction 25) (Westbound Entry Slip Road) (Temporary Prohibition of Traffic) Order (SI 2011/3130)
- The M5 and M6 Motorways (M6 Junctions 8 to 10a) (Temporary Restriction and Prohibition of Traffic) Order (SI 2011/3131)
- The M45 Motorway (M1 Junction 17 to M45 Junction 1) (Temporary Prohibition of Traffic) Order (SI 2011/3132)
- The M69 Motorway (Junction 2) (Northbound Entry Slip Road) (Temporary Prohibition of Traffic) Order (SI 2011/3133)
- The A50 Trunk Road (Sawley Interchange, Leicestershire) (Temporary Restriction and Prohibition of Traffic) Order (SI 2011/3134)
- The M1 Motorway (between Junctions 21 and 20, Leicestershire) (Temporary Restriction and Prohibition of Traffic) Order (SI 2011/3135)
- The A1(M) Motorway (Junction 38) (Temporary Prohibition of Traffic) Order (SI 2011/3136)

== See also ==
- List of statutory instruments of the United Kingdom
