= Cadfael (TV series) =

British historical mystery series (1994–1998)

- Derek Jacobi as Brother Cadfael
- Genre: Period drama Historical mystery
- Created by: Edith Pargeter
- Written by: Russell Lewis
- Directed by: Various
- Starring: Derek Jacobi; Michael Culver; Julian Firth; Sean Pertwee; Eoin McCarthy; Anthony Green; Mark Charnock; Peter Copley; Terrence Hardiman
- Country of origin: United Kingdom
- Original language: English
- No. of series: 4
- No. of episodes: 13

Production
- Executive producers: Neville C. Thompson; Ted Childs
- Producer: Stephen Smallwood
- Production location: United Kingdom
- Running time: 75 minutes
- Production company: Central Independent Television

Original release
- Network: ITV
- Release: 29 May 1994 – 28 December 1998

Cadfael is a British mystery television series that aired on ITV between 29 May 1994 and 28 December 1998, based on The Cadfael Chronicles novels written by Ellis Peters. Produced by Central, it stars Derek Jacobi as the medieval detective and title character, Brother Cadfael. The complete series was released on DVD on 24 August 2009. The series aired in the United States as part of the Mystery! series.

== Plots and setting ==
The series is set in 12th century England, mainly at the Benedictine Abbey in Shrewsbury where Brother Cadfael lives. The titles are from books by Ellis Peters, who wrote The Cadfael Chronicles. The television programmes were filmed in Hungary, as the original abbey in Shrewsbury no longer stands, just the church. The episodes aired in the UK from 1994 to 1998. The novels were written in sequence, marking specific years beginning in 1137 and ending in 1145. Not all the 21 novels were filmed, and there are differences between the plots and characters in the novels and those portrayed on the screen in some episodes, as well as the sequence.

== Cast ==
- Derek Jacobi as Brother Cadfael
- Sean Pertwee as Sheriff Hugh Beringar (Series 1)
- Eoin McCarthy as Sheriff Hugh Beringar (Series 2–3)
- Anthony Green as Sheriff Hugh Beringar (Series 4)
- Michael Culver as Prior Robert
- Julian Firth as Brother Jerome
- Peter Copley as Abbot Heribert (Series 1)
- Terrence Hardiman as Abbot Radulfus (Guest in Series 1, Main for Series 2–4)
- Mark Charnock as Brother Oswin (Series 1–3)
- Albie Woodington as Sergeant Warden (Series 1–3)

== Episodes ==
=== Series overview ===
Series	Episodes	Originally released	
Series	Episodes	First released	Last released
1	4	29 May 1994	19 June 1994
2	3	26 December 1995	25 August 1996
3	3	12 August 1997	26 August 1997
4	3	23 June 1998	28 December 1998

=== Series 1 (1994) ===
Guest stars in this series include Christian Burgess, Michael Grandage, Steven Mackintosh, Sara Stephens, Hugh Bonneville, Toby Jones, Natasha McElhone, Jonathan Firth, Tara Fitzgerald, Sarah Badel, Jonny Lee Miller, Jamie Glover, Jonathan Hyde, Danny Dyer and John Bennett.

No. overall	No. in series	Title	Directed by	Written by	Based on	British air date	UK viewers (million)
1	1	"One Corpse Too Many"	Graham Theakston	Russell Lewis	One Corpse Too Many	29 May 1994	N/A
Assigned by King Stephen to dispose of 94 hanged rebels, Cadfael discovers the body of a murdered man among the corpses and is given just four days to solve the crime.
2	2	"The Sanctuary Sparrow"	Graham Theakston	Russell Lewis	The Sanctuary Sparrow	5 June 1994	N/A
Liliwin is a poor minstrel hired to entertain at an Aurifaber wedding. But when he is dismissed and the master of the house is found unconscious and robbed, Cadfael must find the real thief before the mob takes vengeance.
3	3	"The Leper of Saint Giles"	Graham Theakston	Paul Pender	The Leper of Saint Giles	12 June 1994	N/A
When a cruel middle-aged baron and a beautiful wealthy orphan are to be wed at the abbey, it comes as no surprise when the sadistic nobleman is found strangled to death.
4	4	"Monk's Hood"	Graham Theakston	Russell Lewis	Monk's Hood	19 June 1994	N/A
When an unpleasant and cruel nobleman spites his stepson by ceding his estate to the abbey, he ends up being poisoned by one of Brother Cadfael's medicines.

=== Series 2 (1995–1996) ===
Guest stars in this series include John Hallam, Julian Glover, Ian McNeice, Ronan Vibert, Christien Anholt, Louisa Millwood-Haigh, Ian Reddington, Chloë Annett, John Dallimore, Daniel Betts and Anna Friel.

No. overall	No. in series	Title	Directed by	Written by	Based on	British air date	UK viewers (million)
5	1	"The Virgin in the Ice"	Malcolm Mowbray	Russell Lewis	The Virgin in the Ice	26 December 1995	N/A
A young nun is found violated and murdered, while the brother and sister she was escorting have disappeared. A mysterious forest ranger dedicates himself to rescuing the children, while Brother Oswin blames himself for Sister Hilaria's death. Cadfael must identify the killer and do what he can to aid in the children's rescue.
6	2	"The Devil's Novice"	Herbert Wise	Christopher Russell	The Devil's Novice	18 August 1996	N/A
Cadfael is sure the unlikely novice Meriet is hiding a secret, and when a bishop's missing envoy is found dead, Meriet takes the blame. Cadfael must discover who Meriet is protecting and who is the real murderer.
7	3	"A Morbid Taste for Bones"	Richard Stroud	Christopher Russell	A Morbid Taste for Bones	25 August 1996	N/A
Cadfael and a deputation of monks from Shrewsbury are dispatched to Wales to recover the remains of martyred St. Winifred over the objections of the local lord and residents.

=== Series 3 (1997) ===
Guest stars in this series include Kitty Aldridge, Tom Mannion, Crispin Bonham-Carter, Peter Guinness, Hermione Norris, and Catherine Cusack.

No. overall	No. in series	Title	Directed by	Written by	Based on	British air date	UK viewers (million)
8	1	"The Rose Rent"	Richard Stroud	Christopher Russell	The Rose Rent	12 August 1997	N/A
A beautiful, wealthy widow turns her back on the world to find solace with the church and gives her house over to the abbey for the rent of a single white rose each year.
9	2	"Saint Peter's Fair"	Herbert Wise	Russell Lewis	Saint Peter's Fair	19 August 1997	N/A
A dispute between Church and State over Fair fees leads to a brawl and the murder of a prominent visiting merchant, supposedly by a townsman. As more bodies are found, Cadfael starts to think the Church/State difference isn't the cause after all.
10	3	"The Raven in the Foregate"	Ken Grieve	Simon Burke	The Raven in the Foregate	26 August 1997	N/A
An unpopular and moralistic priest who is new to Shrewsbury refuses to give a pregnant young girl absolution, resulting in her apparent suicide.

=== Series 4 (1998) ===
Guest stars in this series include George Irving, Benedict Sandiford, Louise Delamere, Natasha Pyne, Jonathan Tafler, Richard Lintern, Gregor Truter, Terence Beesley, Sioned Jones, Natasha Little and Lee Ingleby.

No. overall	No. in series	Title	Directed by	Written by	Based on	British air date	UK viewers (million)
11	1	"The Holy Thief"	Ken Grieve	Ben Rostul	The Holy Thief	23 June 1998	N/A
Ramsey Abbey in Cambridgeshire puts in a claim for the remains of St. Winifred, whose reliquary is the object of prayer and lucrative donations to Shrewsbury Abbey.
12	2	"The Potter's Field"	Mary McMurray	Christopher Russell	The Potter's Field	23 December 1998	6.94
A year after Brother Ruald answers his vocation and becomes a monk at Shrewsbury, a body, believed to be his deserted wife, is unearthed near his cottage.
13	3	"The Pilgrim of Hate"	Ken Grieve	Richard Stoneman	The Pilgrim of Hate	28 December 1998	6.24
Cadfael has a peculiarly strange case to solve when Prior Robert finds a dead man inside an old dirty sack. The monastery grounds are filled with pilgrims, mostly the lame and the seriously ill, who are there for Cripples Day hoping to be miraculously cured. As no one will admit to knowing the dead man, Cadfael gets the Abbot's permission to render the body down to the bones to see if he can determine how he may have died.

== Reception ==
Reviewing the episode "The Rose Rent", Matthew Bond stated "The series does have a curiously theatrical style to it, where the rather contrived medieval bustle stops while the principal actors deliver their lines and then starts again when they have finished. Still, it's different, ambitious and Jacobi is in it – which makes three big pluses." In an article discussing depictions of religious characters on British television, Ben Dowell praised Cadfael. Dowell stated "thanks to some gripping stories, good production values and a brilliant performance from Derek Jacobi as the herbalist and former crusading knight, this adaptation of the Ellis Peters books became a regular viewing habit for millions".

== Comparison to the novels ==
- "One Corpse Too Many" was filmed mostly in Hungary. The adaptation for television stuck closely to the original novel, with only minor plot or script deviations to cater to the different medium.
- "The Sanctuary Sparrow" was once again mostly filmed on location in Hungary.
- In the "Leper of Saint Giles", Heribert (Peter Copley) is the abbot, while in the novel, Radulfus has been the Abbot for nearly a year.
- "Monk's Hood" is a close adaptation of the original novel.
- In "The Virgin in the Ice", the plot is significantly changed from the original novel. The action is moved from Ludlow to Cadfael's "home" abbey of Shrewsbury; Brother Elyas's part is replaced by that of Cadfael's young and callow assistant in the herb gardens, Brother Oswin; extra plot elements are introduced to explain the presence of the brigands led by le Gaucher; and the final unmasking of the murderer is different.
- "The Devil's Novice" is largely faithful to the book, apart from renaming Aspley Manor to Ashby. There is an extended prologue showing Clemence's overnight stay at Ashby, where he alienates everyone with his arrogant and patronising manner, except Rosanna, who flirts with him shamelessly. Brother Mark's role in the novel is fulfilled by Cadfael's earnest assistant, Brother Oswin. Hugh Beringar travels out of Shrewsbury, leaving in charge there his less-than-subtle deputy, Sergeant Warden, who repeatedly clashes with Cadfael over the solution to Clemence's murder. Under pressure from Canon Eluard, Warden is all too eager to condemn first Harald, and then Meriet, for the crime. Janyn is caught as he is trying to flee the Abbey, confesses, and is last seen being marched to jail, to await execution.
- "A Morbid Taste for Bones" makes some changes, including secondary characters and proper names. Brother John and Annest are not included, leaving only one set of young lovers for the viewer to follow. The tension between the Welsh villagers and the English monastics is played up considerably, and the acquisition of St. Winifrede is made more dangerous thereby. To that end, the naive and charming Father Huw is recharacterised as the suspicious and rather grubby Father Ianto, who opposes the saint's removal and castigates the monks for haggling over her bones as if she were a bone at a butcher's stall. Bened the smith, while retaining his name, also loses much of his openhearted good nature, being both a suspicious rival of Rhisiart's and a vehement accuser of the monks themselves. In the climax of the adaptation, Brother Columbanus' confession is drawn out by less supernatural means than in the novel. Instead of being hoodwinked by Sioned in the dark, Columbanus confesses to a fevered figure of his own imagination. He is egged on to this by Cadfael, who pretends to see a figure of light bearing down upon them as they keep their vigil in Saint Winifrede's church. Sioned's part is to stay hidden as a witness, but when Columbanus relates with what joy he struck down her father in the saint's name, Sioned loses control and flies at him, with disastrous consequences as Columbanus realises that he has been tricked. Sioned's lover, renamed from Engelard to Godwin, appears to defend Sioned, and Colombanus's accidental death occurs as in the novel. However, Columbanus' own motives are a good deal more ambiguous in the television adaptation. He innocently denies any ambition on his own part to be "the youngest head under a mitre," and his actions appear to stem from religious fervour and criminal insanity, rather than from a cold, calculated pass at fame. Otherwise, the episode remains primarily faithful to the text, with the necessary exception of being well into Abbott Radulfus' tenure at the abbey, instead of introducing the series.
- "The Rose Rent" adaptation makes some changes from the book. The most significant change is that Miles is motivated not by greed, but by secret love for his cousin, and first attacks the rose bush to convince her to let go of her devotion to her deceased husband. Another change is that Cadfael gives the young wife a potion to ease her terminally ill husband's pain, warning her that too much will kill him; in the next scene, the man is dead, implying a mercy killing. In the book, there is no such implication. The husband dies of his illness three years before the novel opens, with no suggestion that Cadfael or the widow acted to hasten his end.
- "Saint Peter's Fair" is an adaptation that contains a shocking twist near the end, different from the novel. It pits Cadfael and Hugh Beringar against each other, with Hugh's loyalty to King Stephen and Cadfael's sense of true justice making them opponents (though they do reconcile at the end of the episode). In the series of novels, the friendship of the two is never imperilled.
- "The Raven in the Foregate" focuses on Cadfael's efforts to prove that Eleanor, called Eluned in the novel, was murdered rather than a suicide and his own guilt at having sent her to Father Ailnoth for confession. Other differences include name changes: "Saran" becomes "Mary" and "Benet" becomes "Edward"; Edward takes over the role played in the novel by Torold Blund from One Corpse Too Many; the addition of Eleanor's blind sister Catherine and deletion of the characters Torold, Father Ailnoth's housekeeper Diota and Torold's fellow squire Ninian.
- In "The Holy Thief", Prior Herluin and Brother Tutilo, a novice, arrive at Shrewsbury unexpectedly from Ramsey Abbey, which has just been destroyed in the civil war. Tutilo has had a vision of St. Winifred. Herluin seizes on this as an excuse to extract the saint's lucrative relics from Shrewsbury, which since acquiring the relics has been receiving hefty sums in donations from pilgrims praying for intercession from St. Winifred. Shrewsbury's Abbot Radulfus has reluctantly agreed to loan out his saint when a bequest arrives for Tutilo: Lady Donata has left him a necklace so valuable that they can afford to rebuild Ramsey Abbey, though that does not seem to have been her intent. While he no longer needs St. Winifred, Prior Herluin is not ready to give her up. When the relics and the necklace disappear, along with Daalny, a singer enslaved to a minstrel and a friend of Tutilo, the Abbot sends Cadfael after them. Daalny turns out to have been abducted and Cadfael finds her and the relics, but the necklace is gone and shortly the hireling who grabbed Daalny and the valuables is found dead almost on Cadfael's doorstep, his head bashed in with a rock. This version follows the main plot of the novel, but omits the subplot of Prior Herluin's efforts to reclaim Sulien Blount, a former novice at Ramsey Abbey; changes the name of the murder victim from "Aldhelm" to "Alfred"; changes the identity of the murderer; alters the gift from Lady Donata to Tutilo from a psaltery to a jewelled necklace, and her motive for giving it to him; and makes the character of Lord Beaumont far more arrogant, cynical and cruel than the character in the novel.
- "The Potter's Field" focuses on Brother Ruald, a potter who left his wife to join Shrewsbury Abbey a year before the story begins. A local nobleman donates a field to the Abbey. While working in the field, which is near Ruald's former home, the brothers discover the bones of a woman who they suspect is Ruald's abandoned wife Generys.
- "The Pilgrim of Hate" varies widely from the novel. In this version, a well-aged corpse is found in the baggage of the pilgrims on Saint Winifred's day, and its identity, not the murder of a faraway knight, becomes the subject of the mystery. Matthew (named "Luc" in the TV series) and Ciaran are brothers, pointing fingers as to who is responsible for their father's death. In this adaptation Luc is the villain. Crippled Rhun (named "Walter" in the TV series), far from being one of Cadfael's most promising future novices, confirms Father Abbot's suspicions that he fakes his condition to earn the charity of those around him; his sister Melangell has been forced by guilt to wait on him hand and foot, even stealing to support their needs. It was the last of Ellis Peters' novels to be adapted for the screen.
