= The Hermit of Eyton Forest =

1987 novel by Ellis Peters

- First edition
- Author: Ellis Peters
- Series: The Cadfael Chronicles
- Genre: Mystery novel
- Publisher: Headline
- Publication date: 1987
- Media type: Print (Hardcover, Paperback), audio book & e-book
- Pages: 224 (Hardcover) 240 (Paperback)
- ISBN: 0-7472-0037-8
- OCLC: 604439564
- Preceded by: The Rose Rent
- Followed by: The Confession of Brother Haluin

The Hermit of Eyton Forest is a medieval mystery novel by Ellis Peters, set in the autumn of 1142. It is the 14th novel in the Cadfael Chronicles and was first published in 1987.

The mystery is set in the Anarchy, the continuing battles between King Stephen and Empress Maud, now besieged in Oxford Castle. Sheriff Hugh Beringar and Brother Cadfael work together to resolve murder and kidnap, the first done in connection with the anarchy, and the second dealing with property and marriages in 12th century England.

One review at the time of publication referred to the "ever-fascinating Brother Cadfael chronicles", said that author "Peters continues to enthrall", and described the "unpretentious but literate style" of this novel. The story was "Swift-moving, intricate plotting, [with a] richly tapestried background". Another reviewer was less impressed, and said that characters were in the main "glibly superficial: lovers are fair and pure; villains cruel and swarthy." However, they enjoyed the main character, as "Brother Cadfael remains as shrewd and unpredictable as ever." A later reviewer found that this was "a great story." They felt that "Brother Cadfael is more an observer than an actor in this work" but overall, the "bodies and red herrings pile up in a satisfying way before all the puzzles are solved."

== Plot summary ==
On 18 October 1142, Richard Ludel, lord of Eaton manor, dies of wounds sustained at the battle of Lincoln in February 1141. Ludel had appointed Abbot Radulfus of Shrewsbury Abbey as guardian of Ludel's 10 year old son Richard. Brother Paul informs Richard that he is orphaned, and has become lord of Eaton manor. As Richard is a minor, Sheriff Hugh Beringar has charge of the manor lands for King Stephen, with the steward John of Longwood running the manor. His grandmother, Dame Dionisia Ludel, does not believe in education for a lord. Her goal is to marry the boy to Hiltrude, daughter of Fulke Astley, who will inherit the estates on either side of Eaton manor: Wroxeter and Leighton.

Dame Dionisia gives the hermit Cuthred and his helper Hyacinth a disused hermit's chapel. The two are present at the funeral of Richard's father. Otherwise, Cuthred never leaves his hermitage.

In November, Eilmund, forester for the abbey, reports unusual damage in the Eyton Forest, and sends Hyacinth to tell the abbot that this is punishment for Richard being kept at the Abbey. Needing a friend, Richard approaches Hyacinth. They form a pact. Returning to the hermitage, Hyacinth saves Eilmund in Eyton Forest by rolling a fallen willow tree off him. Local men carry Eilmund to his assart. Hyacinth runs ahead to warn Annet, Eilmund's daughter, of her father's injury. She asks Hyacinth to fetch Cadfael to set her father's broken leg.

Hugh Beringar says that the Empress Maud is held under siege in Oxford Castle. The Empress sent a messenger from there to Brian Fitzcount, Lord of Wallingford. The messenger was Renaud Bourchier, whose horse had been found, with empty saddlebags and no sign of the man.

Drogo Bosiet and his groom Warin of Northamptonshire appear at the abbey, hunting a villein named Brand who fled his manor. Abbot Radulfus is not well inclined towards Drogo's mission, and recommends him to the sheriff. After Vespers, Brother Jerome meets with Drogo to tell him his suspicion that Brand is in fact Hyacinth, living under a false identity. Overhearing this and recognising the danger, Richard rides his pony to warn Hyacinth, finding him in the Eyton Forest. Hyacinth goes into hiding, as Richard heads back to the abbey. That day, Cadfael leaves Eilmund's assart and encounters Drogo's horse, then the body of Drogo Bosiet, killed by a knife in his back. In the morning, Hugh Beringar and Cadfael find that Drogo was stabbed as he walked his horse on the forest path en route to the abbey. No knife is found. The abbot mentions Brother Jerome's conversation, revealing that Drogo intended to visit the hermitage, and was probably on his return journey when killed.

Cuthred tells Hugh and Cadfael that Drogo visited him the day before, and he has not seen Hyacinth since. Cuthred met Hyacinth, a beggar at the gates of the Cluniac priory in Northampton, at the end of September. Richard has not been seen in the abbey since the day before, at Vespers. Hugh sets a manhunt for both Richard, suspected to have been kidnapped, and Hyacinth, suspected of murder.

Cadfael talks with Rafe of Coventry, of the Earl of Warwick, who is staying at the abbey. At the alms box, he sees a coin struck with the image of the Empress Matilda, and Rafe comes from Oxford. Cadfael surmises that Rafe has come seeking the murderer of Bourchier, however this is denied. Drogo's son Aymer also arrives at the abbey, only to learn that his father has been killed. He plans to remain in the area for a few days to attempt to find the missing villein before returning home.

Cadfael finds Hyacinth by following Annet as she meets Hyacinth. Annet, Eilmund and Hyacinth bring Cadfael in on their secrets. Annet loves Hyacinth and her father approves it, and together are hiding Hyacinth during this manhunt. Hyacinth was with Annet at the time of the murder. Hyacinth confirms that he is indeed Drogo's escaped villein Brand; he is not safe until Aymer has returned home. Hyacinth describes his bad treatment at Drogo's hands. Drogo left Hyacinth landless, but still wanted him for his skill in fine leather work. Hyacinth ran after he beat the steward when he chanced on him raping a local girl. Cadfael promises to keep Hyacinth's secret, at odds with his promise to Hugh.

Hyacinth seeks Richard at Leighton. Hearing a young woman travelling with her father Astley on horseback in the darkness, he runs ahead of them to find Richard locked in a room. Learning that the hermit Cuthred will act as the priest, Hyacinth persuades Richard to go along with the ceremony. After the marriage ceremony, Richard gains respect for Hiltrude; he says why he agreed to the ceremony. She is delighted. They plan Richard's escape. Richard begins his ride after the midday meal. When Astley learns Richard is missing, he is in immediate pursuit.

They arrive simultaneously in the abbey courtyard, Richard on his pony. The courtyard is full of onlookers while Astley and Abbot Radulfus argue over who has legal rights over Richard. Richard shouts out why he agreed to the ceremony, that Cuthred is not a priest, and therefore he knew the marriage to be invalid. At this, Rafe slips away. Abbot Radulfus plans to confront Cuthred the next morning. Hugh Beringar returns from Leighton, and mutes Astley with mention of kidnapping charges. Aymer Bosiet has not left the abbey, and is still a threat to Hyacinth.

The following morning, Abbot Radulfus and Hugh Beringer find Cuthred lying dead within the hermitage, his own knife near his hand. A small casket is broken open and empty, and the breviary is missing. Blood shows on the tip of Cuthred's knife. Dame Dionisia arrives, and is jolted by the sight of the dead man.

When the body of Cuthred is returned to Shrewsbury, Aymer Bosiet recognises the dead hermit. He and his father had met him at Thame one night. He was dressed differently, hair cut in the Norman style, a man who had weapons but no horse. They played dice and chess with him. This explains the murder of Drogo; Cuthred killed him to avoid exposure by Drogo. Aymer leaves the abbey. Cadfael brings Hyacinth out of hiding. Hugh calls off the manhunt. At Eilmund's home, Hyacinth confirms that when they met, Cuthred was well dressed as a knight. Hyacinth stole a habit for him at the priory, for his transformation to hermit. Hugh tells Hyacinth he is free to seek work in the town. In a year and a day, he will come to ask for Annet as his wife.

Rafe seeks Cadfael to treat his knife wound. Rafe de Genville, vassal to Brian FitzCount, and loyal to the Empress Maud, will restore to Brian what is his, recovered in a fight between Rafe and the hermit. Rafe found the jewels which he sought in the reliquary. A personal letter was hidden in the breviary, already read by the dead man, as the seal is broken.

Cadfael tells Hugh that he let Rafe go. It is revealed that Cuthred was in fact Renaud Bourchier, having stolen the Empress's jewels and abandoned his horse and knightly clothes in order to avoid detection. This explains why Bourchier's horse was found with no sign of a body. Hugh recoils upon realising the full horror of the first crime that Renaud Bourchier committed. Hugh is persuaded Rafe acted rightly.

Honour is upheld, the lovers are united, and Richard is safe at school.

== Characters ==
- Brother Cadfael: Herbalist in the Benedictine monastery at Shrewsbury, about 62 in this story. Though long a monk here, he lived as Crusader and sailor before settling near his native Wales. His besetting sin is curiosity.
- Abbot Radulfus: He is head of the Abbey of Saint Peter and Saint Paul, based on the real abbot of that year. He was introduced in Monk's Hood.
- Prior Robert Pennant: He is a monk of aristocratic upbringing, and expectations. He hoped to succeeded as abbot after Abbot Heriford was replaced but instead remained Prior under Abbot Radulfus. Prior Robert was introduced in A Morbid Taste for Bones.
- Brother Paul: He is the monk in charge of the education of the novices and the four young boys at the monastery for schooling.
- Brother Jerome: He is clerk to Prior Robert and confessor of the novices. He likes to report on others, to hear the sound of his own voice, and is rather critical of Brother Paul's ways with the education of the young.
- Brother Winfrid: He is newly assigned to help Cadfael in the herbarium and gardens. He is a monk of about 20 years old; strong but slow, he will do for Cadfael.
- Richard Ludel: He is the only son of Sir Richard Ludel, now 10 years old. He is educated at the Abbey at the direction of his father, in the charge of Abbot Radulfus per an agreement made in the prior year. Richard's mother died earlier; his paternal grandmother is the relative left him. Of the aristocracy, he is the lord of Eaton Manor on his father's death. He is a lively and observant boy, and persistent.
- Sir Richard Ludel: He was the Lord of Eaton Manor southeast of the Abbey, whose liege lord was once William FitzAlan who sided with the Empress; the lands were taken by King Stephen. Sir Richard supported the King by joining the Battle of Lincoln, where he took an ultimately fatal wound. Widowed, he made an agreement for Abbot Radulfus to care for and educate his son until he was of age. He dies at age 35 as the story opens.
- Dame Dionisia Ludel: She is grandmother to young Richard, and a strong woman with desires to enlarge the family's property by her grandson's marriage. She is more distant than fond with her grandson, about 55 years old.
- John of Longwood: He is the steward of Eaton Manor, responsible to Hugh Beringar until young Richard is of age. He manages it fully since the father returned wounded from the battle of Lincoln.
- Hiltrude Astley: She is heiress to two manors either side of Eaton Manor. Her father and Richard's grandmother want her to marry young Richard to merge the manors. Hiltrude prefers a young man nearer her age of 22.
- Sir Fulke Astley: He is the father of Hiltrude, and owner of manors at Wroxeter and Leighton. He is a strong man, nearing 50 years old.
- Hugh Beringar: He is Sheriff of Shropshire, with manors in Maesbury in the north of the shire. About 27 years old, he is married to Aline and father of young Giles. He is King Stephen's man, and a close friend, minds and ethics alike, with Brother Cadfael. He was introduced in One Corpse Too Many.
- Cuthred: He is the hermit who recently entered Shropshire. Dame Dionisia Ludel gave him the use of an old stone chapel with a room attached. He was recommended by monks at the Savigniac house of Buildwas, a small monastery nearby, and quickly accepted as a saint of the Celtic sort (that is, no need for the canonisation process) by the local people. He is killed in a struggle, and was a killer.
- Hyacinth: He is about 20 years old, and arrives with Cuthred to run his errands, as the hermit is bound to his chapel. He is an attractive and strong but wiry young man, who heard the "old story of a youth of that name" from a priest, as Hyacinth related to Abbot Radulfus. An "unnerving fairy thing" in contrast to the hermit of Eyton forest. He has reddish brown hair, the colour of copper beeches.
- Eilmund: He is the Forester for Abbey lands to the southeast of the Abbey, the Eyton Forest.
- Annet: She is the daughter of Eilmund and resides with him in their forest cottage. She loves Hyacinth.
- Drogo Bosiet: He is the Lord of a manor in Northamptonshire, travelling a long ways solely to find an escaped villein they call Brand, both to punish the man and have the value of his skills. He is in his mid-fifties. He is murdered between the hermit's place and the Abby.
- Warin: He is groom to Drogo Bosiet, and a testament to the cruel nature of his master, suffering wounds from almost every encounter with Drogo. So close to Wales and freedom from his villein status, he does not run because he has a family at the Bosiet Manor.
- Aymer Bosiet: He is the elder son of Drogo, travelling separately in this hunt for the escaped villein. He is much like his father in favouring hate over love, power over stronger ties with others, and about 30 years old.
- Renaud Bourchier: He is a knight in the service of the Empress Maud, sent before the siege of Oxford to carry a message and funds to Brian Fitz Count. He never reached nearby Wallingford Castle, but his horse was found along the way, with evidence of theft and violence. His body was not found.
- Rafe of Coventry: He is another late fall visitor to the Abbey, falconer to the Earl of Warwick, travelling on his lord's business. He is armed and travelling alone; of quiet habits, and of a size with Cadfael. He engages in the struggle with Cuthred, leaving with a small wound.

== Reviews ==
This novel earned some high praise, along with disappointment in the characters.

Kirkus Reviews found this novel worthy of praise, starting by saying this is "Another in the ever-fascinating Brother Cadfael chronicles taking the reader back to 12th-century England, where Cadfael's Benedictine Abbey in Shrewsbury is relatively untouched by the country's civil war." The plot focusses on "a different war being waged there, however, after the death of Richard Ludel, Lord of Eaton", whose son was kidnapped from the Abbey. Their commentary on the novel was that it was "Swift-moving, intricate plotting, richly tapestried background, and unpretentious but literate style in the telling once again work their magic as Peters continues to enthrall."

Publishers Weekly was not impressed with the characters, and said that "Unfortunately, most of the characters are glibly superficial: lovers are fair and pure; villains cruel and swarthy. In his 14th appearance, however, Brother Cadfael remains as shrewd and unpredictable as ever."

By contrast, Library Journal, writing about the audio book, said that "No one is exactly what they seem, and more than one character has a past that bears closer examination. Add to this several subplots and a large amount of political intrigue, and you have a great story. Although Brother Cadfael is more an observer than an actor in this work, bodies and red herrings pile up in a satisfying way before all the puzzles are solved."

== Themes and Setting in History ==
The story is set in Shrewsbury and environs. Shrewsbury Abbey continues, and its history notes Abbott Radulfus (sometimes known as Ranulf) and Prior Robert Pennant as real people in its history. Remains of some of the places stand today, and can be seen from one of the trails. The manors at Wroxeter and Leighton are real places close to Shrewsbury.

The Anarchy, a period of dispute over who was rightful king, was deep in its tangle. King Stephen held the crown, while his cousin Empress Maud claimed she was the rightful successor to her father King Henry I. She and her forces engaged in battles with King Stephen's forces. The prior year, King Stephen had been taken and imprisoned for several months, as his own brother, Henry, Bishop of Winchester turned his coat twice. Even with the field thus clear, Empress Maud was unable to garner sufficient support in the key city of London to be crowned.

King Stephen's wife, Queen Matilda, led the army when her husband was imprisoned, and succeeded both in pressing London with their forces just outside the city and in taking Robert of Gloucester as prisoner. Robert was the main support of his half-sister, allowing negotiation for the release of King Stephen. Immediately after that drama, Empress Maud moved to Oxford. King Stephen's brother, the powerful Bishop Henry, again supported the King, even worked to sway supporters of Maud to join the King for the sake of the nation. After a period of illness, King Stephen began again to take strategic towns, like Wareham and besieged Empress Maud in Oxford, all as related in the story. Geoffrey of Anjou, second husband of Maud and father of their children, was more interested in conquests in Normandy, where he was in the time of this novel, than in helping his wife in any way. Robert of Gloucester was sent, nonetheless, to persuade Geoffrey to help his wife. He returned at the end of October to Wareham as the siege of Oxford continued, with Empress Maud trapped in Oxford Castle by that siege.

Empress Maud would not stop battling, but could not win for herself.

The plot of the novel arises from the very real chaotic political situation of fall 1142 in England. Brian Fitz Count was one of her strongest supporters on the battlefield and in the long run. It was rumoured that they were lovers. During the siege of Oxford, Brian Fitz Count was running low on funds at his place in Wallingford Castle, supporting soldiers in her cause.

Hermit monks of the Anchorite following were a feature of medieval England.

The choice of the name Hyacinth for the attractive and handsome young man who arrives in the novel as the boy to assist the hermit Cuthred is also of the medieval period. In our modern era, it is simply the name of a spring flower. In Greek mythology, Hyacinth is killed because two of the gods pursue him for his beauty; from his blood sprang a beautiful flower. In pre-Hellenic myths, he was the "classical metaphor of the death and rebirth of nature", which well suits the villein who is fought over by his lord, disappears from his home to reappear in a new place, fall in love, make new friends and a new life. Hyacinth relates a very brief version of the Greek myth as an "old story" he heard from a priest, when Abbot Radulfus asks about his name when the two first meet. Abbot Radulfus mentions having heard of a bishop by that name. Perhaps he means the man who later became Cardinal Hyacinth and at the end of his long life, Pope Celestine III, or a Cardinal Hyacinth mentioned as a correspondent to Thomas Becket.

Many characters in this novel, beyond the Benedictine Abbey itself, were of the landed gentry, with manors to direct, to gain by marriage, and to inherit. In the feudal system, they owed allegiance to their liege lord, and had both free and villein workers doing the work on the land or in the house. The group of characters who were either free men or villeins held distinctly different views of the Sheriff, and the law in general, as a protector of their life and property. Where the landed gentry relied on the Sheriff to serve them, the class with skilled trades or who worked the land knew their innocence had to be completely proved before facing the Sheriff.

The themes of the novel include the medieval sense of honour; loyalty, and its reverse in a nation, treason.

== Publication history ==
Fantastic Fiction lists six hardback editions in English, from 1987 to 2001. The first edition was issued in June 1987 by Headline Book Publishing, ISBN 0747200378 / 9780747200376 (UK edition); the latest in June 2001 by Chivers Large print, Chivers, Windsor, Paragon & C, ISBN 0754015904 / 9780754015901 (UK edition). There are nine paperback editions from 1987 to 2002; the latest in April 2002 by Chivers Large print (Chivers, Windsor, Paragon & C, ISBN 0754024512 / 9780754024514 (UK edition). Four audio cassette editions from 1994–98; two audio CD edition from 2001 and the latest in May 2013 by Blackstone Audiobooks, ISBN 1470886820 / 9781470886820; and an MP3 edition in February 2012.

The Kindle edition was released in July 2013, ISBN B00E1X36MQ.

Goodreads lists 33 editions of The Hermit of Eyton Forest, in English, Italian, French, German, Polish, Dutch. Editions are in hardback, paperback, audio cassette, audio CD, and MP3 player, published from 1988 to 1 March 2012.

- French: L'ermite de la forêt d'Eyton (Frère Cadfael, #14), Published 31 August 2002 by 10/18, Mass Market Paperback, 280 pages, Serge Chwat (Translator) ISBN 9782264033406
- Italian: L'eremita della foresta, Published 1998 by Longanesi, La gaja scienza #550, Hardcover, 228 pages, Elsa Pelitti (Translator) ISBN 9788830414693
- German: Der geheimnisvolle Eremit [The Mysterious Hermit] (Bruder Cadfael, #14), Published 1991 by Heyne Deutsche Erstausgabe, Paperback, 284 pages, urgen Langowski (Translator) ISBN 9783453048416
- Dutch: Het stille woud [The Silent Forest], Published 1990 by De Boekerij, Paperback, 208 pages, Pieter Janssens (Translator) ISBN 9789022511367
- Polish: Pustelnik Z Lasu Eyton, Published 2006 by Zysk i S-ka, 275 pages, ISBN 9788372989215

In addition to editions in English, French, German and Spanish, WorldCat lists a 2000 book edition in Korean.

- Spanish: El Ermitaño de Eyton Forest, Published by Grupo Editorial Random House Mondadori : Debolsillo, 2002, [Barcelona], María Antonia Menini ITranslator), Los Jet de Plaza & Janés, 283 pages, ISBN 9788497591737
- Korean: 에이튼숲의은둔자 : 엘리스피터스장편소설 / Eit'ŭn sup ŭi ŭndunja : Ellisŭ P'it'ŏsŭ changp'yŏn sosŏl, Author: 김훈옮김; Ellis Peters, Published by 북하우스, Sŏul-si : Buk Hausŭ, 2000, ISBN 9788987871523

== Sources ==
- Bradbury, Jim (2004). The Routledge Companion to Medieval Warfare. Routledge. ISBN 978-1-134-59846-5.
