= Robert, 1st Earl of Gloucester =

Illegitimate son of Henry I of England (c.1090–1147)

Robert of Caen
- Earl of Gloucester
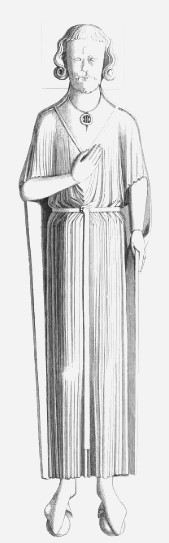
- Effigy of Robert Consul, St James' Priory, Bristol. 1840 drawing
- Successor: William FitzRobert
- Born: c. 1090; Caen
- Died: 31 October 1147 (aged 56–57); Bristol Castle
- Noble family: Normandy
- Spouse: Mabel FitzRobert (m. 1119)
- Issue more...: William FitzRobert, 2nd Earl of Gloucester; Roger of Worcester; Maud of Gloucester, Countess of Chester; Richard FitzRobert, bishop of Bayeux
- Father: Henry I of England

Robert FitzRoy, 1st Earl of Gloucester (c. 1090 – 31 October 1147), (Note: Alias Robert Rufus, Robert de Caen (Latinised to Robertus de Cadomo), and Robert Consul.) was an illegitimate son of King Henry I. He was the half-brother of the Empress Matilda, and her chief military supporter during the civil war known as the Anarchy, in which she vied with Stephen of Blois for the throne of England.

== Early life ==
Robert was probably the eldest of Henry's many illegitimate children. He was born before his father's accession to the English throne, either during the reign of his grandfather William the Conqueror or his uncle William Rufus. He is sometimes and erroneously designated as a son of Nest, daughter of Rhys ap Tewdwr, last king of Deheubarth, although his mother has been identified as a member of "the Gay or Gayt family of north Oxfordshire", possibly a daughter of Rainald or Reginald Gay (fl. 1086) of Hampton Gay and Northbrook Gay in Oxfordshire. Rainald had known issue, Robert Gay of Hampton (died c. 1138) and Stephen Gay of Northbrook (died after 1154). A number of Oxfordshire women feature as the mothers of Robert's siblings.

Robert may have been a native of Caen or he may have been only the constable and governor of that city, jure uxoris.

Robert's father had contracted him in marriage to Mabel FitzRobert, daughter and heir of Robert Fitzhamon, but the marriage was not solemnised until June 1119 at Lisieux. His wife brought him the substantial honours of Gloucester in England and Glamorgan in Wales, and the honours of Sainte-Scolasse-sur-Sarthe and Évrecy in Normandy, as well as Creully and Thorigny. After the White Ship disaster late in 1120, and probably because of this marriage, in 1121 or 1122 his father created him Earl of Gloucester. He commissioned the translation of Welsh historical sources which the subject lent to Walter Espec of Helmsley, and he, in turn, lent to others.

== Earl of Gloucester ==
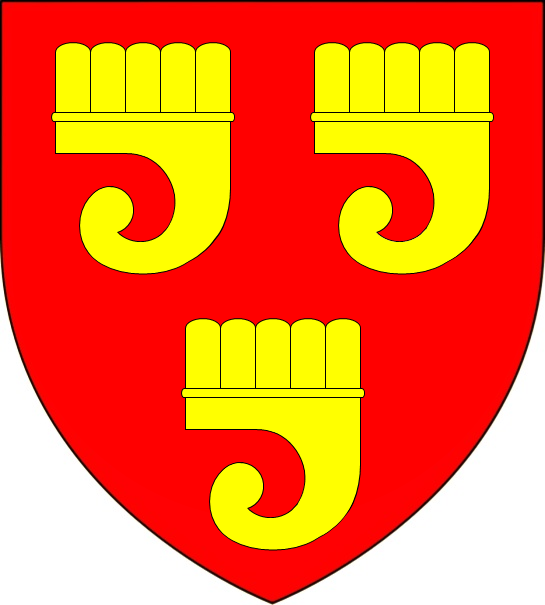
Attributed arms of Robert FitzRoy, 1st Earl of Gloucester: Gules, three clarions or (later successively arms of de Clare, Earl of Gloucester and Granville, Earl of Bath)

In either 1121 or 1122, his father created him the 1st Earl of Gloucester. Robert became powerful in both the countries of Normandy and England with this act, as Caen may have remained his principal seat.

Robert possessed many castles and land through grants made to him by his father, King Henry. He was the keeper of Gloucester Castle, Canterbury Castle and fortresses of Bristol, Leeds and Dover. Bristol Castle was Robert's principal seat in England and he constructed additions to its exterior fortifications and rebuilt the interior. Robert held Gloucester Castle in right of his earldom, however, after Miles of Gloucester, 1st Earl of Hereford was created earl, Miles became the constable of it under Robert, his liege-lord, as Florence of Worcester called him.

There is evidence in the contemporary source, the Gesta Stephani, that Robert was proposed by some as a candidate for the throne, after his father's death, but his illegitimacy ruled him out:

Among others came Robert, Earl of Gloucester, son of King Henry, but a bastard, a man of proved talent and admirable wisdom. When he was advised, as the story went, to claim the throne on his father's death, deterred by sounder advice he by no means assented, saying it was fairer to yield it to his sister's son (the future Henry II of England), than presumptuously to arrogate it to himself.

This suggestion cannot have led to any idea that he and Stephen were rivals for the Crown, as Geoffrey of Monmouth in 1136 referred to Robert as one of the 'pillars' of the new King's rule.

For the first five years after the death of his father, Henry I, and usurpation of power by Stephen in 1135, Robert seems to have been an inactive spectator of the struggle between Stephen and Matilda.

In June 1138, Geoffrey Plantagenet, Count of Anjou persuaded Robert to join the party opposing King Stephen through prayers and promises given to Robert when Geoffrey entered Normandy. It is said that when the hostilities first began, Robert acted with "great prudence, and still held aloof," but that his hostility to Stephen was not disguised. Thus, while Robert sided in June 1138 with the party opposing Stephen's rule was a great change in the power dynamics in England, it may not have been quite as unexpected as some scholars make it out to be, as "his hostility to Stephen was scarcely disguised."

In 1139, Robert, along with Guy de Sablé and several others, took Matilda to England. On 31 August 1139, they landed in England and were received at Arundel castle by their step-mother Adeliza, the queen-dowager. Matilda was given leave from King Stephen to pass through England under safe conduct. Robert hosted Matilda after her arrival in England at Bristol Castle and led her forces against Stephen.

Robert commanded the empress's forces during the Battle of Lincoln, during which Robert's son-in-law Ranulf de Gernon, 4th Earl of Chester commanded his own forces for the empress.

The capture of King Stephen at the Battle of Lincoln on 2 February 1141 gave Empress Matilda the upper hand in her battle for the throne, but by alienating the citizens of London she failed to be crowned queen. Robert imprisoned Stephen in Bristol. Her forces were defeated at the Rout of Winchester on 14 September 1141, and Robert of Gloucester was captured nearby at Stockbridge.

Without the Earl of Gloucester, the party of Matilda was powerless, so the two prisoners, King Stephen and Robert of Gloucester, were then exchanged. But by freeing Stephen, Empress Matilda had given up her best chance of becoming queen. She would later return to France, where she died in 1167, though her son succeeded Stephen as King Henry II in 1154.

With the success of Stephen in England, Robert and Matilda returned to Normandy, where the earl recruited fresh levies. He soon crossed the channel again, taking with him his nephew, Henry, then ten years old. Robert was devoted to the education of his young charge and taught him English habits and culture. Following their crossing of the channel, Robert went to Wareham, Dorsetshire and sent Henry to Somerset, where he was received by friends of his mother, Matilda.

The civil war continued on without much success, with alternate triumphs and defeats for three more years. However, it came to a quiet close in 1147 when Robert died and the queen and her son, now deprived of Gloucester's protection, returned to Normandy.

Robert of Gloucester died in 1147 at Bristol Castle, where he had previously imprisoned King Stephen, and was buried at St James' Priory, Bristol, which he had founded in 1129.

== Family ==
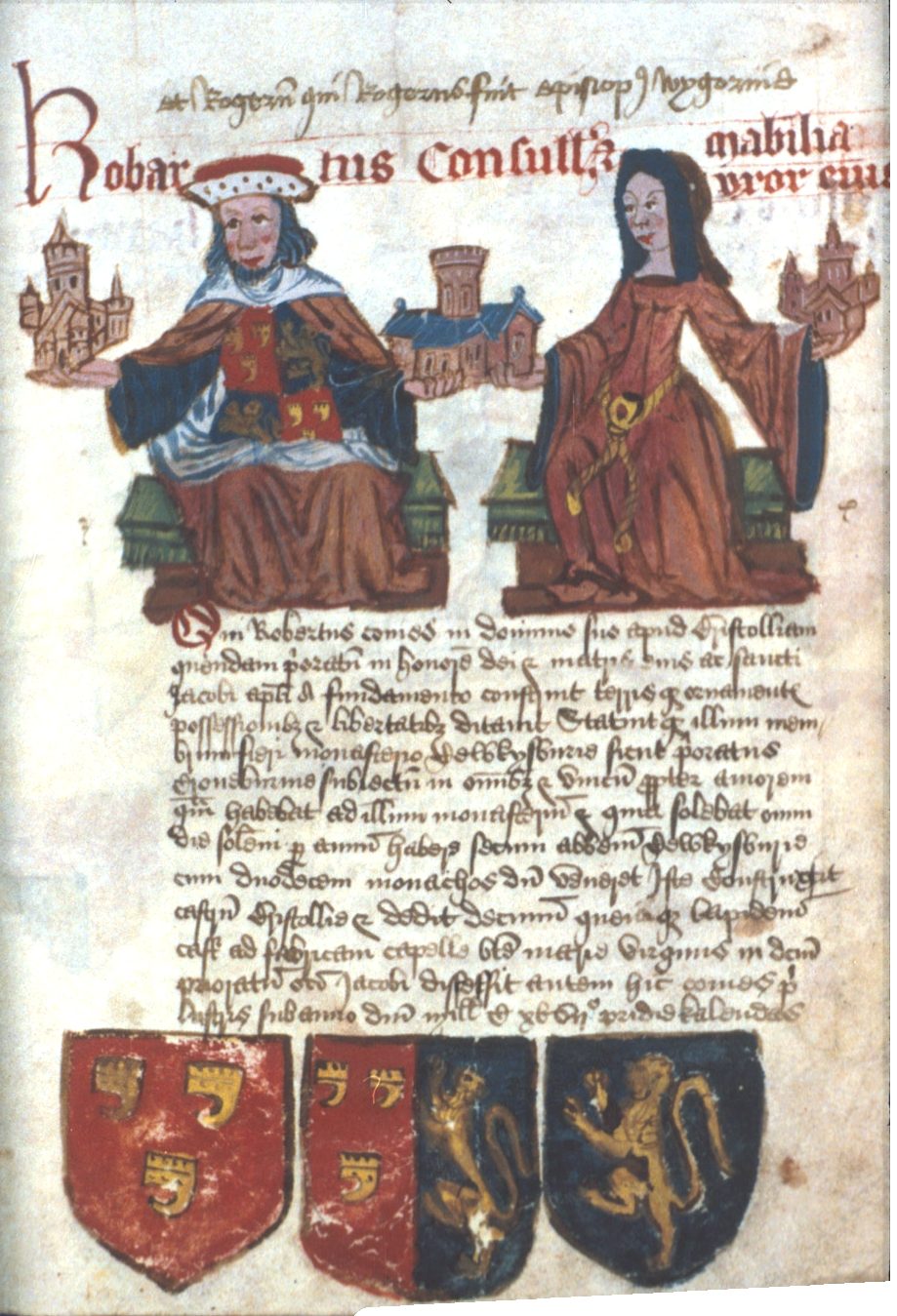
Robartus Consull et Mabilia uxor eius ("Robert Consul and Mabel his wife"). They are shown holding churches or abbeys which they founded or were benefactors of, including Tewkesbury Abbey. The attributed arms shown quartered on his tabard and below are: Left: Gules, three clarions or (de Clare, Earl of Gloucester); Centre: Gules, three clarions or (de Clare, Earl of Gloucester) impaling Azure, a lion rampant guardant or (FitzHamon); Right: Azure, a lion rampant or. Tewkesbury Abbey Founders Book (c. 1500 – 1525), Bodleian Library, Oxford

Robert and his wife Mabel Fitzhamon married in 1119, and they had seven children:

- William FitzRobert (c. 1121–1183): succeeded his father as 2nd Earl of Gloucester
- Roger FitzRobert (c. 1123–1179): Bishop of Worcester
- Hamon FitzRobert, knight (c. 1124–1159): killed at the siege of Toulouse.
- Richard FitzRobert, Lord of Creully (c. 1125–1175): succeeded his mother as Sire de Creully.
- Maud of Gloucester, Countess of Chester aka Matilda FitzRobert (c. 1126–1189): married in 1143 Ranulf de Gernon, 4th Earl of Chester.
- Mabel FitzRobert: married Aubrey de Vere
- Philip FitzRobert, Lord of Cricklade (c. 1130–1148)

He also had four illegitimate children:

- Richard FitzRobert (died 1142): Bishop of Bayeux [mother: Isabel de Douvres, sister of Richard de Douvres, bishop of Bayeux (1107–1133)]
- Robert FitzRobert (died 1170): Castellan of Gloucester, married in 1147 Hawise de Reviers (daughter of Baldwin de Reviers, 1st Earl of Devon and his first wife Adelisa), had daughter Mabel FitzRobert (married, firstly, Jordan de Chambernon and, secondly, William de Soliers)
- Mabel FitzRobert: married Gruffud, Lord of Senghenydd, son of Ifor Bach
- Thomas FitzRobert

== In popular culture ==
Robert of Gloucester is a figure in many of the novels by Ellis Peters in The Cadfael Chronicles (written between 1977 and 1994) where he is seen as a strong moderating force to his half-sister (see Saint Peter's Fair). His efforts to gain the crown for his sister by capturing King Stephen and her own actions in London are part of the plot in The Pilgrim of Hate. His capture by Stephen's wife Queen Mathilda is in the background of the plot of An Excellent Mystery. The exchange of the imprisoned Robert for the imprisoned Stephen is in the background of the plot of The Raven in the Foregate. Robert's travels to persuade his brother-in-law to aid Empress Maud militarily in England is in the background of the novel The Rose Rent. His return to England when Empress Maud is trapped in Oxford Castle figures in The Hermit of Eyton Forest.

Robert's return to England with his young nephew Henry, years later the king succeeding Stephen, is in the background of the plot of The Confession of Brother Haluin, as the battles begin anew with Robert's military guidance. Robert's success in the Battle of Wilton leads to the death of a fictional character, part of the plot of The Potter's Field. In the last novel, he is a father who can disagree with and then forgive his son Philip (see the last novel, Brother Cadfael's Penance). In that last novel, Brother Cadfael speculates on the possibly different path for England if the first son of old King Henry, the illegitimate Robert of Gloucester, had been recognised and accepted. In Wales of that era, a son was not illegitimate if recognised by his father, and to many in the novels, Robert of Gloucester seemed the best of the contenders to succeed his father.

Robert is also a central character in Sharon Penman's 1995 novel When Christ and His Saints Slept. He was also central in the struggle during the Anarchy as portrayed in Ken Follett's 1989 novel The Pillars of the Earth, in the 2010 mini-series, and in the 2017 video game of the same name too.

== See also ==
- Kenfig Castle – an important 12th-century motte and bailey for controlling the Norman lands in South Wales
- The Anarchy

== Footnotes ==
=== Citations ===
Peerage of England
New creation	Earl of Gloucester; 1121/2–1147	Succeeded by William Fitz Robert
