= Hortensius, Friend of Nero =

1936 novel by Edith Pargeter

- 1937 US edition
- Author: Edith Pargeter
- Language: English
- Genre: Historical fiction
- Published: 1936
- Publisher: Lovat Dickson (UK) 1936; Greystone Press (US) 1937
- Publication place: UK
- Pages: 232

Hortensius, Friend of Nero is a 1936 novel by Edith Pargeter. In it, Hortensius attempts to save the Christian wife of a friend in the arena, an act for which he is forced to flee by Nero, along with a Persian slave whom he falls for. It was Pargeter's first historical novel.

Peter Christensen noted that “In the 1930s, other political novels about Rome had a special appeal if they dealt with the end of the Republic or with Nero, since they could be fitted into the framework of the failure of democracy in Europe after World War I or the rule of a mad dictator.” He classed Hortensius, Friend of Nero as one of these political novels.
