= Eoin McCarthy =

Irish actor (born 1963)

- Born: 1963 (age 62–63); Dún Laoghaire, County Dublin
- Occupation: Actor
- Years active: 1993–present

Eoin McCarthy (born 1963, Dún Laoghaire, County Dublin, Ireland) is an Irish actor.

He appeared in films such as Alien vs. Predator and television programmes such as Cadfael, Lovejoy and Roman Mysteries.

He also starred in the Dutch TV-film Kilkenny Cross.

== Filmography ==
Film
Year	Title	Role	Notes
1994	Being Human	Leader	
1995	Land and Freedom	Connor	
1997	Tomorrow Never Dies	Yeoman - HMS Bedford	
2002	The Escapist	Escort Officer 1	
2003	Mystics	Conor	
2003	Bloom	Blazes Boylan	
2004	Alien vs. Predator	Karl	
2008	Made of Honor	Cousin Ewan	
2011	Tribe	O Connell	
2013	Traveller	OConnell	
