= The Raven in the Foregate =

1986 novel by Ellis Peters

- First edition
- Author: Ellis Peters
- Series: The Cadfael Chronicles
- Genre: Mystery novel
- Publisher: Macmillan
- Publication date: 1986
- Media type: Print (Hardcover, Paperback), audio book & e-book
- Pages: 208
- ISBN: 0-333-40719-9
- OCLC: 37994411 (Mysterious Press 1997)
- Preceded by: An Excellent Mystery
- Followed by: The Rose Rent

The Raven in the Foregate is a medieval mystery novel by Ellis Peters, fourth of the novels set in 1141, a year of great political tumult in the Anarchy. It is 12th of The Cadfael Chronicles, and first published in 1986.

It was adapted for television in 1997 by Carlton Media for ITV.

The harsh, unforgiving Father Ailnoth is brought as pastor for Holy Cross church in the foregate. When he disappears just two weeks later, Cadfael and Hugh Beringar solve the mystery.

== Plot summary ==
In the mild December 1141 Abbot Radulfus heads to Westminster for a second legatine council in one year. Henry, Bishop of Winchester calls all the bishops and major clerics back to reinstate allegiance to the crowned King. King Stephen is free, released by the contender Empress Maud in trade for her main supporter, her half-brother Robert of Gloucester. Abbott Radulfus returns on 10 December with a new priest for the Holy Cross parish in the Foregate. Father Ailnoth, lately clerk to Bishop Henry, comes with a housekeeper, and her unskilled nephew Benet, seeking work near her. Benet does heavy garden work needed before the first frost for Cadfael.

In just eight days, Father Ailnoth alienates or directly offends almost everyone in the Holy Cross parish. He refuses confession, absolution, and then communion to Eluned, a local girl who kills herself in despair at the rejection. He hits the children with his staff, especially when he is teaching them to read. He refused to baptise an infant born too sick to live more than an hour, then refused the infant burial in blessed ground because it was not baptised. In the market, he accuses the local baker of short-weighting his loaves of bread. On the land, he pays no heed to property lines until he oversteps and is challenged. The provost of the foregate meets with Abbot Radulfus to relay the complaints. The Abbot talks with Ailnoth, who does not understand the change in his role, from bishop's clerk to the cure of souls, nor accept advice. His treatment of the infant and the young woman rankles all, not just their own families.

On Christmas Eve, Brother Cadfael sees Ralph Giffard, a local noble and loyal to Empress Maud, walking away from town, then he sees Father Ailnoth walking out, staff in hand, sleeves billowing, too distracted to offer a greeting. Both Benet and Sanan Bernière appear for the Christmas Eve services (matins) at the Abbey, while her stepfather Giffard attends at Saint Chad. Benet and Sanan slip out separately to Cadfael's workshop for an uninterrupted chat, the start of their romance.

Christmas morning, the housekeeper Diota Hammet reports Ailnoth missing all night. A search finds his body in the mill pond, hit on the back of the head and drowned. Two days later, Hugh returns from Canterbury formally appointed Sheriff in Shropshire. King Stephen gave Hugh two names to hunt, squires of FitzAlan in Normandy, supporters of the Empress. The names of Torold Blund and Ninian Bachiler are announced to Shrewsbury. Blund has left England already. Giffard reports that Ninian Bachiler is known as Benet in Shrewsbury Abbey, and that Giffard received a note asking to meet the stranger on Christmas Eve, which he passed to Father Ailnoth. The purpose of the righteous Ailnoth marching past Cadfael is now clear: to confront the boy, meeting him in Giffard's stead. Ninian is a murder suspect.

Diota was injured Christmas Eve. Cadfael treated her wounds. Cynric sends Cadfael to aid newborn Winifred, now in the care of her grandmother Nest, mother of the late lovely Eluned. Cadfael confronts Benet with his true name, Ninian. Ninian is in Shrewsbury by the work of his resourceful childhood nurse, Diota Hammet. He plans escape through Wales to Gloucester. Sanan will go with Ninian. He will leave when his name is cleared, and Diota is safe; then he and Sanan will marry. On the day Giffard comes forward, Sanan meets Ninian at Cadfael's workshop. They leave for his hiding place just before Hugh arrives.

Cadfael recalls two items that were not found with Ailnoth's body: a small cap over his tonsure, and his staff. Cadfael retrieved the cap from the boys who found it at the pond early Christmas morning. He finds the staff near where the body was found. The ebony staff, with its band of silver, holds long, greying hairs in it, suggesting its victim was Diota. Cadfael presses Diota for the full story of Christmas Eve. The priest found sin in both his housekeeper and the boy, after he spoke with Giffard. She followed Ailnoth on his way to meet Ninian, begging him not to harm the boy. She clung to him, begging for mercy; Ailnoth beat her on the head with his staff, leaving the wounds Cadfael had tended. Terrified and dazed, she let go of him, and made her way home.

A thaw lets Cynric dig the grave for Ailnoth. The baker Jordan Achard was seen out early Christmas morning, and two will attest he was not at home. Hugh will announce this after the funeral as a way to get the guilty person talking, a scheme Cadfael terms devious. The funeral is well attended. Word that Hugh will charge the murderer draws many to the end of the funeral, including Ninian out of hiding. As the baker loudly protests his innocence of murder and guilt of adultery, Ralph Giffard mistakes Ninian as one to hold his horse. Ninian hides in his country-boy role again. Brother Jerome recognises Ninian holding the horse. About to call him out, he sees Giffard come to claim his horse and pay a silver penny to the boy. Thrown off by Giffard's non-recognition, Jerome breaks off, thinking himself mistaken and allowing Ninian to escape.

Cynric is the one witness to Ailnoth's death. Cynric watched the scene between Ailnoth and Diota from the place where Eluned died, seeing what happened after Diota left. When Ailnoth beat Diota, she grabbed the end of the staff to stop him; he pulled it back as she let go and ran away. The priest reeled backwards, his head hitting a dead willow; then he fell into the pond. Cynric walked to see the man's face in the night. Cynric believed the will of God left Ailnoth dead exactly where Eluned died. Hugh's scheme worked in an unexpected way. Abbot Radulfus accepts Cynric's story, as does Hugh. Cadfael's evidence supports the story. Cynric finishes the burial.

== Characters ==
- Brother Cadfael: He is the herbalist monk at the Abbey of St. Peter and St. Paul in Shrewsbury. He is a sometime detective, and about age 61 in this story.
- Abbot Radulfus: He heads the Benedictine Abbey of St. Peter and St. Paul at Shrewsbury. He is based on the real abbot of this era (Ranulf or Radulfus). Radulfus is a tall healthy man with an air of authority. He is a strong leader to his monks, with a sense of justice as well as deep religious convictions.
- Prior Robert Pennant: He is an aristocratic priest at the Abbey, based on a historical person, who followed as Abbot after Radulfus. He is also a man taller than average, a good speaker, but more concerned with the elite, than the full range of humankind or of human experience.
- Brother Jerome: He is a monk who admires Prior Robert, and a man who likes the sound of his own voice, especially when chiding others or carrying tales. He is a man of slight build.
- Hugh Beringar: Sheriff of Shropshire. He is in the King's service, about 26 years old, and a close friend of Cadfael. His manors are in the north of Shropshire. He was appointed Deputy Sheriff by King Stephen three years earlier, and has acted as Sheriff since the death of Stephen's prior choice earlier in 1141. In this novel, he is appointed as Sheriff by the King. He was introduced in One Corpse Too Many.
- Aline Beringar: She is the much-loved wife of Hugh, mother of two-year-old Giles, who is godson to Cadfael. Introduced in One Corpse Too Many.
- Father Ailnoth: He is the priest recommended by Bishop Henry to fill the vacancy in the Holy Cross parish in the Foregate of the Abbey. He was previously clerk to the bishop. He is a tall, dark haired man of patrician appearance, 36 years old. He is a man with every virtue, except humility and human kindness, the Abbot observed of him, ruefully.
- Diota Hammet: She is a widow, housekeeper to Father Ailnoth. She served him for the last two or three years when he was in Winchester and comes with him to his new post. She is about 40 years old; her hair is greying.
- Benet: Young dark haired man of 20 years. He accompanied his aunt Diota to Shrewsbury in hopes of finding work near her. He was assigned to aid Cadfael, now lacking an assistant.
- Cynric: He is the verger of the parish of Holy Cross. He arrived a couple years after Cadfael came to the Abbey. He is a taciturn, single man who is a favourite with the children. He served about 17 years under the late Father Adam, was very close to him.
- Torold Blund: Young squire of FitzAlan in service of Empress Maud. He has married Godith, settling in Anjou. Both were introduced in One Corpse Too Many. He is again sought by King Stephen for his work in support of his enemy; sent as scout from Normandy, believed by Hugh to have returned there.
- Ninian Bachiler: He is the second young squire of FitzAlan sent as scout from Normandy in the service of the Empress before her recent fall from grace; he is sought by King Stephen.
- Sanan Bernières: She is a young woman from a local household that has supported the Empress Maud in this period of Anarchy. She is 18 years old, named for her Welsh grandmother, but otherwise of a Norman heritage. She lost first her father, then her mother. Now her family is her stepfather and younger stepbrother.
- Ralph Giffard: He is the stepfather to Sanan, father to Ralph, age 16, and twice widowed. His early loyalty to the cause of Empress Maud led to losses of land for him and for his stepdaughter. He is now more interested in passing his remaining lands to his son. He married Sanan's mother when she was widowed. He owns two or three manors in the shire and a town house in Shrewsbury. Tall, handsome, just over 50 years old.
- Eluned: Single mother of baby Winifred, daughter of Nest and a beautiful, kind, if not bright, young woman. She was refused absolution and communion by Father Ailnoth. Being cut off from the church, she drowned herself in the pond.

== Setting in history ==
The ruling theme is the importance of humility and human kindness, as the letter of the law is not sufficient for goodness or justice.

When Shrewsbury is visited by an Inquisition-style orthodoxy (The Heretic’s Apprentice) or a harshly punitive version of Christianity (The Raven in the Foregate), the stories end with a reaffirmation of the positive, tolerant faith espoused by Cadfael. (Source:Cadfael)

Abbot Radulfus in his eulogy at the funeral of Father Ailnoth:

For even the pursuit of perfection may be sin, if it infringes the rights and needs of another soul. Better to fail a little, by turning aside to lift up another, than to pass by him in haste to reach our own reward, and leave him to solitude and despair. Better to labour in lameness, in fallibility, but holding up others who falter, than to stride forward alone.

The turn of events in the Anarchy are as told in this novel. Henry of Blois did turn his coat twice in less than twelve months, from his brother King Stephen to his cousin Empress Maud and back again to his brother. Those two add to his prior turns in earlier years. He called two legatine councils, as he was the papal legate of England. Once King Stephen was released in the exchange for Robert of Gloucester, he and his queen were again crowned at Christmas time, in front of his supporters. His enemies were subject to his anger, and to excommunication from the church. William FitzAlan had been the Sheriff of Shropshire until King Stephen took Shrewsbury, and worked from Normandy to support Empress Maud. On Stephen's death, he again became Sheriff.

In the period of the Anarchy, contemporaries mourned the state of civic life.

The events of the story take place in real locations in England. Most action happens in Shrewsbury Abbey and the town of Shrewsbury. The second legatine council was held in Westminster, nearer King Stephen and his court. The King proceeded to Canterbury for his Christmas court, where Hugh Beringar met him, nearly 250 miles from Shrewsbury on modern roads. King Stephen and his wife Queen Matilda were crowned a second time in Canterbury Cathedral on Christmas. Many of the supporters of the Empress were gathered in Gloucester, where her half brother was Earl, the planned destination of Ninian and Sanan.

Community life was governed heavily by the rules of the Church, so excommunication, as the fictional story tells in the story of the young woman Eluned who killed herself after being refused absolution then communion, was a heavy punishment.

In this and other novels of the series, Cadfael makes wine for his guests. In the 12th century, this was possible, there were vineyards in southern England. This may be due to the warmer climate in northern Europe. Whether it is solely due to the warmer climate, or solely due to the preference for wine over beer brought by the Norman nobility and French monks, or a combination of both is debated. The number of vineyards declined in following centuries.

Several of the books in the series include maps of the abbey, Shrewsbury, or areas nearby in Shropshire, including this novel. This French language site has an interactive map from one of the books showing the location of the Abbey's vineyards. Besides the hardback editions of the Cadfael Chronicles, two maps are included in Cadfael Country.

The late frost let Benet/Ninian learn how to use a spade to turn over the soil in all of Cadfael's gardens, and begin to learn how to make a few herbal medicines in his few December weeks at the Abbey.

== Continuity ==
Shrewsbury Abbey was begun about 58 years before the story with French monks from Seez, as mentioned in the later novel The Confession of Brother Haluin, possibly explaining the vineyard and wine making. Shrewsbury Abbey had a reliquary of Saint Winifred, translated from Wales in 1137, which story is told in the opening book of the series and in the annals of the Abbey. The character Torold Blund, squire to a supporter of the Empress, featured in One Corpse Too Many, when Shrewsbury was taken by the King, and Cadfael and Hugh Beringar began their close friendship. Hugh had been betrothed to Godith. She escaped with Blund, and in this novel we learn they have married. Their escape was aided by Cadfael. Hugh married another that summer, and is much pleased with his wife.

== Reviews ==
Kirkus Reviews finds thin plotting but excellent characters and narrative.

== Publication history ==
First published in February 1986 by Macmillan, the story was included in The Fourth Cadfael Omnibus published in 1993. Six hardback editions were published in the US and the UK, the latest being a large print by Chivers in July 2000.

Nine paperback editions were published, starting in January 1987 by Sphere. The latest was published in April 2001 by Chivers Large Print.

Eleven audio editions have been released, from 1993. The latest audio book was issued by Blackstone Audio Books in January 2012 on CD.

The novel has been published in several other languages, listed at Goodreads.com.

- French: Les ailes du corbeau, Published 1992 by Éditions 10/18, 301 pages ISBN 9782264032447
- German:
  - Mörderische Weihnacht (Bruder Cadfael, #12), Published 1990 by Heyne Deutsche erstausgabe, Paperback, 218 pages ISBN 9783453042223
  - Bruder Cadfael Und Die Mörderische Weihnacht [Brother Cadfael and the Murderous Christmas], Ein Mittelalterlicher Kriminalroman, Paperback, Published by Heyne, München, 2006 218 pages, Jürgen Langowski (Translator) ISBN 9783453873315
- Italian: Il corvo dell'abbazia, Hardcover, Published January 1996 by Longanesi 1, 224 pages Elsa Pelitti (Translator) ISBN 9788830413368
- Dutch: De ware aard [The true nature], Paperback, Published 1995 by De Boekerij, 193 pages, Pieter Janssens (Translator) ISBN 9789022510629
- Portuguese: O Corvo em Foregate: Crónicas do Irmão Cadfael, Paperback, Published March 1997 by Publicações Europa-América, 204 pages ISBN 9721042846

== Television adaptation ==
The Raven in the Foregate was adapted into a television program as part of the Brother Cadfael series by Carlton Media and Central for ITV, shown in 1997. It is the tenth of the thirteen programs in the series. It filmed on location in Hungary and starred Sir Derek Jacobi as Cadfael. The plot has a focus on the girl (Eleanor / Eluned in the book) who Father Ailnoth would not absolve.
