= The Rose Rent =

1986 novel by Ellis Peters

- First edition
- Author: Ellis Peters
- Series: The Cadfael Chronicles
- Genre: Mystery novel
- Publisher: Macmillan
- Publication date: 1986
- Media type: Print (hardcover, paperback) & audio book
- Pages: 190 (hardcover edition), 240 pp (paperback edition), map of Shrewsbury & Environs
- ISBN: 0-333-42682-7 (hardcover edition), 0-446-40533-7 (paperback edition)
- OCLC: 59097624
- Preceded by: The Raven in the Foregate
- Followed by: The Hermit of Eyton Forest

The Rose Rent is a medieval mystery novel set in the summer of 1142 by Ellis Peters. This is the thirteenth novel in The Cadfael Chronicles, first published in 1986.

It was adapted for television in 1997 by Carlton and Central for ITV.

A young monk is murdered next to a white rose bush at a home bequeathed to the Abbey by a young widow. Brother Cadfael finds the murderer as the widow makes peace with her loss.

== Plot summary ==
Shrewsbury Abbey anticipates two events coming on 22 June in 1142: honouring the day five years earlier when Saint Winifred's reliquary was placed on its altar, and paying the rent due to the widow Judith Perle. Three years earlier, she lost both her husband and her unborn child within three weeks. She gave their home in the Foregate to the Abbey, half her patrimony, in a charter. The Abbey pays a single white rose from the garden, delivered to her in person, as rent. Brother Eluric delivers the rose. Eight days before the feast, he asks Abbot Radulfus to be released from this duty, as he is tormented by his desire for the widow Perle. The Abbot asks Niall the bronzesmith, who rents the property, to deliver the rose rent.

Judith asks Niall to make a new buckle for a girdle. She has several active suitors but is not interested in remarrying, still grieving her losses. She considers taking the veil at Godric's Ford with Sister Magdalen. Sister Magdalen advises her to wait, saying their door is always open as a place of retreat.

Niall, a widower, keeps his young daughter with his sister in Pulley, three miles away. He returns from an overnight visit to find that the white rose bush has been hacked at its bole. At its base lies young Eluric, dead with a knife by his side. While investigating the murder scene with the Abbot and Brother Anselm, Brother Cadfael finds a distinctive footprint and makes a wax impression. Judith arrives to pick up the repaired girdle; Cadfael tells Judith about Eluric's desire for her. That night, Judith tells her servant Branwen that in the morning she will make the gift unconditional, which news Branwen shares in the kitchen. The next day, Judith fails to arrive at the abbey. The Sheriff, called back to town, Cadfael, and Abbot Radulfus believe that Judith was kidnapped, either to be forced into marriage or to void the charter by her absence on rent day. The search begins. Cadfael finds the once firmly-attached bronze tag from the end of Judith's girdle, suggesting a struggle. It is found under the bridge where a boat had been hauled up for convenient use, stolen by the kidnapper. Cadfael searches the River Severn with Madog, finding the stolen boat discarded downstream.

Bertred, a foreman in her business, believes he knows where Judith is being held. Late that night, he goes to Hynde's disused counting-house, in an outbuilding to store the wool clips. The disused room was not known to the searchers in the daytime. Bertred hears Judith Perle inside with her gaoler, Vivian Hynde. Though confined, Judith is in control of the situation. Vivian pleads with Judith to marry him, but she scornfully rejects him. Bertred's foothold gives way and he falls; the sounds alert those within and the watchdog. Bertred runs toward the river to escape. The watchman and his dog pursue. The watchman gives him a glancing blow to the head but Bertred dives into the water, hits rocks on the shelving bank and lies senseless. The watchman assumes the interloper is swimming across the river.

In the counting-house, Judith convinces Vivian to take her to Sister Magdalen, where she will say she has been in retreat. She will not reveal Vivian's role. She wants her good reputation intact. He agrees; soon they slip out to stay in his mother's house until they can head for Godric's Ford. Someone sees Bertred in the shallows, and then kicks him out into the current of the river. Cadfael, working near the river the next morning, finds the dead body of Bertred. After examining the body, Cadfael sees that Bertred's boot is a match for the wax impression. He seems to be the murderer of Eluric. The watchman at Hynde's tells Hugh and Cadfael that Bertred was at the storehouse the night before, where they find the broken window sill. They search within but find no trace of the pair's presence the night before.

Niall visits his daughter again. On his return in the moonless night, he sees a man on a horse with a woman riding pillion and recognises Judith Perle. He follows them for an hour when Judith parts from the man on horseback, walking alone. Once Judith is alone, Niall hears her scream as someone attacks her with a knife. He struggles with her attacker and knocks the knife away, getting a gash on his left arm. The attacker flees. Niall and Judith continue to Godric's Ford. Judith asks Sister Magdalen for her help. Sister Magdalen stays close to Judith, keeping her reputation safe in Shrewsbury.

Judith tells her tale to Hugh, including her promise to keep her captor's name secret. The captor was with her when they heard Bertred fall, so he did not kill Bertred. Hugh acquiesces, telling her that Vivian Hynde is already taken; Hugh will release him eventually. Cadfael asks Sister Magdalen to obtain two well worn left shoes from Judith's household. She sends them via a trusted messenger, Edwy Bellecote the young carpenter. Cadfael examines the shoe that belonged to Bertred. It does not match the mould of the print from Brother Eluric's murder. The other shoe matches. Realizing the trouble is not over, Cadfael walks out to find the bush ablaze. The attacker dropped a burning torch over the wall onto the oil-covered bush. The bush is destroyed.

Early the day of Saint Winifred's translation, Hugh asks Judith's cousin Miles Coliar when he gave his boots to Bertred. Miles' mother says it was the day Eluric was found dead. Miles had killed Eluric and then given his boots to Bertred. Miles confesses all and he is taken away by Hugh's men to await his trial.

Judith is betrayed by her own family. Miles hoped that she would enter the convent, leaving her shop and property to him. He destroyed the rose bush so the house would revert to her estate. Eluric stopped him in the first attack on the rose bush, when Miles stabbed him, leaving that boot print. Later, he followed Bertred to the Hynde property and killed him. The next night he followed Judith to Godric's Ford, where he tried to kill her, stopped by the unexpected Niall. Miles is the only person with a motive to kill Judith, as he would inherit her business and property. Likely Miles never intended the first murder, but his ambition and greed led him down a path to murder. Judith has the full responsibility of the clothier business in her hands again, and will remake the charter with the Abbey, making a full gift of that house.

That afternoon, Niall and his young daughter Rosalba arrive at Judith's house with a white rose. He picked the bloom the day before the fire. He delivers the rose rent to her, thus securing the charter. As he steps away, Judith asks him to stay, rediscovering her reasons to live.

== Characters ==
- Brother Cadfael: Benedictine monk and herbalist at Shrewsbury Abbey in Shrewsbury. He is about 62 years old in this story.
- Hugh Beringar: He is the Sheriff of Shropshire, King Stephen's man, and close friend of Cadfael. He owns manors at Maesbury in the north of the shire. Hugh is about 27 years old in this story and was introduced in One Corpse Too Many.
- Alan Herbard: He is the young man appointed as deputy to Sheriff Hugh Beringar.
- Abbot Radulfus: He is head of Shrewsbury Abbey of Saint Peter and Saint Paul, based on the real abbot of that year.
- Brother Anselm: He is the Precentor, and one of the two monks who witnessed the charter with Judith Perle, along with Cadfael. He is about 10 years younger than Cadfael.
- Brother Eluric: He is a monk at Shrewsbury Abbey, one who was given over to the monastic life at age 3, never knowing any of the world (an oblate). He recently made his final vows, and is just past 20 years old.
- Sister Magdalen: She is a nun at the Benedictine cell at Godric's Ford. She was introduced in The Leper of Saint Giles.
- Niall: He is a bronzesmith who has a shop and home in the property given to the abbey by Judith Perle. He was widowed five years earlier and has a young daughter Rosalba. The late Father Adam (see The Raven in the Foregate) gave her that name, meaning white rose.
- Judith Perle: She is a widow and sole mistress of the Vertiers' clothier business, skilled in all its aspects. She is 25 years old.
- Miles Coliar: He is Judith Perle's cousin, age 27. He manages the family business for Judith.
- Agatha Coliar: She is the mother of Miles, sister of Judith Perle's late mother. She is a widow, and with Miles, all the family left to Judith.
- Vivian Hynde: He is a suitor of Judith Perle. His father William owns the biggest sheep flock in the central western uplands of the shire. He is a few years younger than Judith, and rather irresponsible, already in debt.
- Branwen: She is a servant girl in the house of Judith Perle.
- Godfrey Fuller: He is a suitor of Judith Perle. He is a local dyer & fuller, a guildsman who is already twice widowed, and marries to increase his wealth and power in the town. He is about 50 years old, and very direct in his pursuit of Judith.
- Bertred: He is Judith Perle's foreman weaver, and a wishful suitor.
- Edwy Bellecote: He is the son of master carpenter Martin Bellecote, 18 years old, and with his father, maker of the coffin for Bertred. He was introduced in Monk's Hood.
- Madog of the Dead-Boat: He is a Welsh fisher and ferry man some years older than Cadfael, expert in locating people who have drowned in the river Severn. He was first mentioned in Monk's Hood.

== Literary significance and reviews ==
The Library Journal review in 1987 said that "twelfth century England blossoms again as Cadfael in his understated way moves through the now familiar environs of Shrewsbury piecing together a devious plan that went awry."

Publishers Weekly likes the characters of this story, as well as Peters's writing.

Kirkus Reviews finds the stories "unflaggingly inventive".

The most recent audio book edition for libraries from Blackstone Audio carries this review:

Peters's complex character Brother Cadfael, who applies his forensic skills in an authentic Middle Ages setting, surrounded by other monks, chivalrous knights and flirtatious ladies, has won the author critical acclaim and comparisons with Ngaio Marsh and P.D. James. (The Brother Cadfael novels inspired the PBS television series Cadfael)

Susan Gillmor notes that "English novelist Edith Pargeter, writing under her pseudonym of Ellis Peters, does not disappoint either in her skillful weaving of an intricate whodunit, ornamented with abundant historical detail, including the portrayal of an historically accurate late thaw and delayed planting that occurred in England in 1142, and how that affected Brother Cadfael's herbarium." The description of the clothier trade is also accurate, from "carding and teasing to the loom", "even the dyestuffs came seasonally, and last summer's crop of woad for the blues was generally used up by April or May". She finds that "Brother Cadfael's continued popularity is the result of the seamless blending of creative mystery plots with historical authenticity, as The Rose Rent beautifully illustrates. (1986, 190 pages)"

== Title ==
A widow has entered into a charter with the Shrewsbury Abbey in which she gave the house and lands where she lived with her late husband to the Abbey. She made one stipulation, that she receive a single white rose from the bush on the property, on the feast day of the translation of Saint Winifred. The title may also be a pun on a significant scene where the rose bush is damaged (i.e. 'rent').

== Themes and setting in history ==
Grief and love, ambition and greed are the themes of the novel.

The story is set in the real town of Shrewsbury, in the period of the Anarchy, when King Stephen is on the rise after a very rough year in 1141. During the King's illness early in the year 1142, Empress Maud moved into Oxford, while her staunchest supporter, Robert of Gloucester went over to Normandy for meetings with her husband Geoffrey of Anjou, to give her more help. Military action by the King is away from Shropshire, at Wareham and Cirencester, giving heart to his supporters. In the shire, people focus in June on doing the tasks of agriculture and sheep shearing, delayed by the late frost (longer spell of cold weather in the spring).

The main characters of the plot reveal the life of the skilled craftspeople and merchants in the commonalty of the era. The widow is wealthy because she inherited her father's business, there being no sons. She learned every aspect of the business of making cloth from wool, from her father. The men who have an eye on her and her successful operation are all in the same stratum of society: her foreman, her cousin, a man with large flocks of sheep, a prosperous dyer and fuller, and a bronze smith. Because her father has died, she has an unusual amount of freedom to choose in marriage. But the pressures on her from those seeking a merger by marriage, or a marriage of love, are constantly rising as her clothier business remains prosperous.

All the aspects of the clothier trade are described as the story unfolds, from sheep shearing to carding the wool, to dyeing, fulling and weaving it, including the sources of the dyes. This era is in the start of the formation of craft guilds in England (Middle Ages Economics). Much of the clothier crafts grew in the countryside, outside London, where innovations in process took hold more quickly.

== Publication history ==
Five hardback editions were issued, beginning in October 1986 by Macmillan. The latest edition was printed in June 2000 by Chivers Large Print.

Eight paperback editions were published beginning in December 1987 by Sphere. The latest edition was published in June 2000 by Chivers.

Nine audio books have been released, the first on audio cassette by Blackstone Audio Books in December 1990. The most recent issue was by the same publisher in February 2012 on CD.

The novel has been published in several other languages, per Goodreads.com.

- French: Une rose pour loyer (Frère Cadfael, #13) Published 2002 by 10/18 Mass Market Paperback ISBN 9782264033390
- German: Der Rosenmord (Bruder Cadfael, #13) Published 1994 by Heyne Deutsche Erstausgabe, Paperback, 252 pages ISBN 9783453045910)
- Italian: Il roseto ardente (Hardcover) Published 1997 by Longanesi 215 pages Elsa Pelitti (Translator) ISBN 9788830414051
- Dutch: Een witte roos (Paperback) Published 1991 by De Boekerij 198 pages Pieter Janssens (Translator) ISBN 9789022511350)

== Television adaptation ==
The Rose Rent was adapted into a television program as part of the Brother Cadfael series by Carlton Media and Central for ITV, in Season 3, Episode 1. It filmed on location in Hungary and starred Sir Derek Jacobi as Cadfael, Kitty Aldridge as Judith, and Tom Mannion as Niall Bronzesmith.

The adaptation makes some changes from the book. The most significant change is that Miles (Crispin Bonham-Carter) is motivated not by greed, but by secret love for his cousin, and first attacks the rose bush to convince her to let go of her devotion to her deceased husband. Another change of note is that Cadfael gives the young wife a potion to ease her terminally ill husband's pain, warning her that too much will kill him; in the next scene, the man is dead, implying a mercy killing. In the book, there is no such implication; her husband died three years before the novel opens, and references to his death include no hint that Cadfael or the widow acted to hasten his end.
