= The Confession of Brother Haluin =

1988 novel by Ellis Peters

- First edition
- Author: Ellis Peters
- Series: The Cadfael Chronicles
- Genre: Mystery novel
- Publisher: Headline
- Publication date: 1988
- Media type: Print (Hardcover, Paperback), audio book & e-book
- Pages: 205 (Hardcover) 208 (Paperback)
- ISBN: 0-7472-0061-0
- OCLC: 32347176
- Preceded by: The Hermit of Eyton Forest
- Followed by: The Heretic's Apprentice

The Confession of Brother Haluin is a medieval mystery novel set in the winter of 1142–1143 by Ellis Peters. It is the fifteenth novel in the Cadfael Chronicles, and was first published in 1988.

Brother Haluin makes a deathbed confession, then survives. He vows a pilgrimage to atone for his past error, uncovering an unexpected story, and a murdered woman, before he and Cadfael return to the Abbey.

== Plot introduction ==
In Oxford Castle, Empress Maud has been besieged for months by King Stephen. Sheriff Hugh Beringar learns that the Empress took advantage of the heavy snow and frozen rivers for a miraculous escape. She and several allies crossed the frozen river through Stephen's lines, and walked to Abingdon, where they got horses to ride to Wallingford Castle. She is safe with her brother Robert of Gloucester and her major supporter Brian FitzCount. Oxford Castle surrendered, the men allowed to march home. Robert of Gloucester returned from Normandy with a boy of nine years named Henry Plantagenet, the eldest son of the Empress and her second husband Geoffrey of Anjou. For the moment, the long running battle between these two contenders has begun anew, each with a talent of "conjuring defeat out of victory". King Stephen joined his brother Henry, Bishop of Winchester, and calls his sheriffs to meet him there for the Christmas feast. On his return, Sheriff Hugh Beringar learns of Haluin's accident.

== Plot summary ==
At Shrewsbury Abbey, the heavy snowfall in mid-December 1142 causes severe damage to the slate tile roof of the guest hall. Doing his share of the repair work, Brother Haluin falls down 40 feet. His prospects for survival are small, so he confesses his past with the de Clary family.

Hugh Beringar tells Cadfael that the wife of de Clary lives at Hales, while her son Audemar, sworn to King Stephen, resides in Staffordshire. In early March Haluin asks to make a pilgrimage for penance. His vow burns in him: a pilgrimage on foot to Bertrade's mother, Adelais, and to Bertrade's tomb at Hales, east of Shrewsbury. Haluin goes with Brother Cadfael. On 4 March, they begin. They meet with Adelais, who offers the forgiveness Haluin begs. Bertrade is not buried at Hales. They learn that the family tomb is at Elford in Staffordshire. Their trip to Elford takes nearly a week. They arrive to find Adelais in the church, kneeling before the tomb, as if she is their shadow. Adelais shelters them in her dower house. Haluin spends the cold night on his knees, alongside Cadfael at the de Clary tomb. At sunrise, a curious Roscelin arrives at the church timely to assist Cadfael in bringing Haluin to his feet. Roscelin says he was sent away by his father to serve Audemar, their friend and overlord. Lothair, bringing food, sends the young man away.

Starting home, a sudden snowstorm forces them to seek shelter at the manor of Vivers. Cenred, the lord of the manor, learns that Haluin is an ordained priest. He asks Haluin to officiate at the wedding of his much younger half-sister, Helisende, to a nobleman on the morrow. His own son, who was raised with Helisende, has fallen in love with her, a prohibited relationship. Haluin agrees. Cadfael meets Helisende, who says that she agrees to this marriage freely.

Edgytha's body is found, murdered. Cenred sends word ahead to Elford with this news. Cadfael sees snow beneath her body, not atop it, suggesting she was on her way home from Elford. The household gathers in the hall at Vivers, save one: Helisende. Jean de Perronet suspects the planned marriage is linked to this death. Roscelin Vivers arrives home, angry that his father is marrying off Helisende. Roscelin did not see Edgytha at Elford. Helisende is not there to speak for herself. Audemar arrives, taking charge. With no bride there is no marriage. Cadfael and Haluin leave on a new path bypassing Lichfield. As evening nears, they approach the new Benedictine convent at Farewell planned by Bishop Roger de Clinton. Next morning, Haluin recognises Bertrade and she recognises him. She is Sister Benedicta, sent from Polesworth to help this new place. Cadfael negotiates an hour's meeting between Brother Haluin and Sister Benedicta with Mother Patrice, who informs the family that Helisende is safe with them.

At Vivers manor, they learn that Helisende is not blood kin to Roscelin. Adelais admits to her foul deeds long ago. They realize Edgytha knew as well, and Adelias admits that Edgytha was killed by another family servant, since fled, in an overzealous effort to prevent a scandal. Adelais tells them that Bertrade, Helisende and Helisende's father have met at Farewell. The father was a clerk in her household. Cadfael attests to the meeting, telling Haluin's tale in so doing. This stunning news is hard for the Vivers family to accept, a shock to Audemar, a challenge to de Perronet. Helisende is still loved by the Vivers, blood kin or not. Adelais has lands to leave her granddaughter. Roscelin is joyous. Audemar claims Helisende as his niece, and as overlord places his niece with Cenred when she leaves Farewell. He and Roscelin ride back with Adelais. Audemar banishes his mother to Hales. Cadfael returns to Farewell. Haluin is happy, and has no anger for Adelais. The two Benedictine brothers walk home to Shrewsbury in completion of the vow, the truth having changed so much.

== Characters ==
- Brother Cadfael: Herbalist Benedictine monk at the Abbey of Saint Peter and Saint Paul in Shrewsbury, who joined the cloister later in life, about age 40. He is about 62 or 63 in this novel.
- Abbot Radulfus: Head of the Abbey for the last four years, modelled on the historical abbot of that era.
- Brother Winfrid: Latest assistant to Cadfael in the herbarium, now progressing to learn the medicines made from the plants grown in the gardens. Introduced in The Hermit of Eyton Forest.
- Brother Conradin: Master builder for the Abbey, in his 50s and robustly strong. One of the first child oblate monks, taught by the original monks from Seez in Normandy, he had been part of the group that built the structures in use.
- Brother Rhun: Young monk who aided in the treatment of Haluin after his fall. Introduced in The Pilgrim of Hate.
- Brother Haluin: Best illuminator of the manuscripts among the monks, who entered the Abbey at age 18, eighteen years ago. From a landed family, well educated. Always takes on the hardest tasks at hand. Soon after Cadfael arrived, Haluin was one of his first assistants in the herbarium. As a learned man, he was ordained a priest in the Abbey, but never performed any of the rites.
- Hugh Beringar: Sheriff of Shropshire, in the name of King Stephen, and close friend of Cadfael. Married to Aline, father of 3 year old Giles, who is godson to Cadfael. Introduced in One Corpse Too Many. About 27 or 28 in this novel.
- Bertrade de Clary: Young woman in the noble house where Haluin was sent as a teen for four years. She loved Haluin.
- Adelais de Clary: Mother of Bertrade and Audemar, and widow to their Crusading father Bertrand; now living in the family manor at Hales at the far edge of Shropshire. Once a woman of great beauty, now in her late fifties. Her misdeeds years ago drive the story; a controlling noble woman.
- Gerta: Lady's maid to Adelais at the manor at Hales since her daughter married, about 40 years old.
- Audemar de Clary: Lord of the manors of this noble family, who keeps the main household at Elford in Staffordshire; not yet 40. Married with a young son. He keeps a small dower house for his mother, who has her own staff.
- Cenred Vivers: Friend of and vassal to Audemar, residing in a manor nearby in Staffordshire.
- Lady Emma Vivers: Wife of Cenred, mother of Roscelin.
- Edgytha: In service at the Vivers manor; raised both Roscelin and Helisende from babies; about 60 years old. Found murdered in the day or two that Cadfael and Haluin seek rest at the manor.
- Roscelin Vivers: Son of Cenred, about 18 or 19 years old, handsome, energetic, cheerful, and in love with Helisende, a problem. His father sent him to stay at the manor of Audemar for a while.
- Helisende Vivers: Girl of 17 or 18 years of age, much younger half-sister to Cenred, from his father's second marriage late in life. Raised with Roscelin in the Vivers household. About to be married, as the story opens.
- Sister Benedicta: Mother of Helisende; she joined the Benedictines at Polesworth when her husband died, eight years before the story opens. Skilled at the garden.
- Jean de Perronet: Honorable and handsome young lord from Buckingham, suitor to Helisende for two years; Cenred hopes they will marry soon. About 25 years old.
- Sister Ursula: Hospitaler at Farewell Abbey, one of two Benedictine nuns sent from Polesworth Abbey, to teach and assist the sisters there as the new structures are built.
- Mother Patrice: Abbess of the new house at Farewell, selected by the Bishop Roger de Clinton.
- Lothair and Luc: Father and son in service to Adelais de Clary. Lothair served Bertrand de Clary in the Holy Land, and was likely descended of a Norman who came over with the Conqueror.

== Themes and setting ==
The importance of the truth is a major theme in this novel. The use of power over others for one's own ends and the damage it can do, and of course, the power of confession are at the heart of the plot.

The story begins at the moment when King Stephen loses his advantage over the competing claimant for the crown he wears when Empress Maud takes advantage of the cold and snowy weather to escape the siege. It was a dramatic event, amazing given the presence of the King and his army besieging the town for months, hardly any food left for them. The month before it looked a desperate situation for the Empress, then the tables turned in a spate of bad weather. Why the King did not move in on her when he had her trapped is for speculation. Was it his nature not to put a woman in chains? Was he ever optimistic that she would surrender?

As remarked by the characters in the novel, it is as if the years of warring factions, since Empress Maud came from Normandy and Anjou to Arundel and began the confrontation, begin anew when they might have ended with a clear-cut victory.

The move by her half-brother, Robert of Gloucester, to bring her son to England was in retrospect the wisest move for the Empress's long term power. Young Henry Plantagenet became King Henry II on the death of King Stephen. Though his mother, King Stephen and he were all descendants of William the Conqueror, the English dynasties are named for the father. Thus Henry was the first Angevin king in England, beginning 331 years of rule by the House of Plantagenet, though his father Geoffrey of Anjou never set foot in England.

That jolting escape in the snowstorm occurred about the same time as Brother Haluin makes the startling deathbed confession of his youthful sins, never before confessed. When he survives his injuries, he makes a pilgrimage seeking forgiveness from the one person he thinks is the only survivor offended by his sin. He learns that part of his confessed acts never happened; his actions never led to anyone's death.

His choice of penance, a pilgrimage to the place where he did what needed atoning, was very much of the times, of the 12th century in Christian England.

The places named in the novel are real, including Shrewsbury, Shrewsbury Abbey, Hales, Lichfield, Elford, the Priory at Farewell under construction by Bishop Roger de Clinton (temporary wooden structures being built in stone), and every stop along the way with a place name, including crossing the River Tame shortly before arriving in the village of Elford. Vivers family and their manor is fictional, set among these real places.

The story is set in the era of feudalism and the manorial system. The other significant aspect of life was the ongoing Crusades to the Holy Land. Bertrand de Clary felt the call to the Crusades once his two children were born, leaving his wife more power than she might otherwise have exerted on her seventeen-year-old daughter. Young men in their teens often travelled to another manor to learn military skills (squires), or in the case of Haluin, clerk duties. Adelais de Clary used her power to ruin her daughter's life, and tried to do the same to the handsome young man who had been living at her manor for four years.

As she admitted to Brother Cadfael in a shocking confession:

"Too comely!” she said. "I was not used to being denied, I did not even know how to sue. And he was too innocent to read me aright. How such children offend without offense! So if I could not have him", she said starkly, "she should not. No woman ever should, but not she of all women".

She wanted him for her young lover, he wanted to marry her daughter and her daughter wanted to marry him. The young people were unaware of the mother's strong desires and equally strong dislike of being refused or denied what she wanted. In the presence of the father, the young lovers might well have had their way and married. Instead, in this system where women in general had little power, she works a large amount of evil actions on the two young people in her home, also deceiving another family and her son who is working in place of his father. The full truth is known only to her until the chance event of Haluin surviving a disastrous fall, then seeking her out. He and her daughter made reasonably good lives despite her, but Haluin had internalised great sufferings for 18 years before he could release his memories of intense youthful love, see his daughter full grown (as Cadfael had first seen his son) and open his eyes to the suffering of others.

== Critical reception ==
Stephen Knapp makes a concise point about the 12th century world depicted in this novel, a major difference from the present day. The novel takes "a satisfying journey through mid 12th century England and warm feeling for the comfort and security the people of that time had for an all-knowing and benevolent God."

== Publication history ==
This novel has been published in five hardback editions in English, from March 1988 to November 2001 in the US and the UK. The three most recent are large print editions. Seven paperback editions have been issued, the first in 1988, ISBN 0-7736-7265-6 / ISBN 978-0-7736-7265-9 Canada (English speaking) edition. Mysterious Press, Chivers, Sphere, and General Publishing Company issued the others. The most recent is a large print soft cover edition by Chivers in August 2002.

Five audiobooks were issued, beginning in December 1994 by Chivers ISBN 0-7451-4380-6 / ISBN 978-0-7451-4380-4 (UK edition). Readers include Sir Derek Jacobi and Patrick Tull. The most recent was on audio cassette in March 2002 by The Audio Partners, read by Stephen Thorne, ISBN 1-57270-257-5 / ISBN 978-1-57270-257-8 (USA edition). None of the audiobooks are on CD, unlike earlier books in the Cadfael Chronicles.

It has been published in French, Italian, German, Dutch and Polish editions, listed at Goodreads.com.

- French:
  - La confession de Frère Haluin, Published 1992 by Editions 10/18, 283 pages ISBN 978-2-264-01658-4
  - La confession de Frère Haluin (Frère Cadfael, #15), Published 2002 by 10/18, Mass Market Paperback ISBN 978-2-264-03341-3
- Italian:
  - La confessione di fratello Haluin (Hardcover), Published 1 January 1999 by Longanesi, 181 pages, Elsa Pelitti (Translator) ISBN 978-88-304-1528-7
  - La confessione di fratello Haluin (Paperback), Published 2001 by Tea, 181 pages, ISBN 978-88-502-0024-5
- German: Bruder Cadfael und das fremde Mädchen [Brother Cadfael and the strange girl] (Bruder Cadfael, #15), Published 1 January 1993 by Heyne, Deutsche Erstausgabe, Paperback, 188 pages, ISBN 978-3-453-06139-2
- Dutch: De laatste eer [The Last Honor] (Paperback), Published 1996 by De Boekerij, 176 pages, Pieter Janssens (Translator) ISBN 978-90-225-1184-8
- Polish: Spowiedź Brata Haluina, Published 2007 by Zysk i S-ka, 236 pages ISBN 978-83-7506-150-5

Worldcat shows holdings of editions in Spanish, Korean, and Russian in addition to English:

- Spanish: La confesión de fray Aluíno, María Antonia Menini (translator), Publisher Barcelona Grijalbo D.L. 1992, ISBN 84-253-2382-7, ISBN 978-84-253-2382-9
- Korean: 할루인수사의고백 : 엘리스피터스장편소설 / Halluin Susa ŭi kobaek : Ellisŭ P'it'ŏsŭ changp'yŏn sosŏl, Publisher 북하우스, Sŏul-si Buk Hausŭ, 2000, ISBN 89-87871-56-8, ISBN 978-89-87871-56-1
- Russian: Исповедь монаха : Ученик еретика [Confessions of a monk: trainee heresy] /Ispovedʹ monakha : Uchenik eretika, Publisher Амфора, Sankt-Peterburg Amfora, 2006, ISBN 5-94278-978-9, ISBN 978-5-94278-978-7
