= Saint Peter's Fair =

1981 novel by Edith Pargeter

- First edition
- Author: Ellis Peters
- Language: English
- Series: The Cadfael Chronicles
- Genre: Historical whodunnit, Crime novel
- Publisher: Macmillan Publishers
- Publication date: May 1981
- Publication place: United Kingdom
- Media type: Print (hardcover)
- Pages: 224
- ISBN: 0-333-31050-0
- OCLC: 7870525
- Dewey Decimal: 823/.912 19
- LC Class: PR6031.A49 S2 1981b
- Preceded by: Monk's Hood
- Followed by: The Leper of Saint Giles

Saint Peter's Fair is a medieval mystery novel by Ellis Peters, set in July – September 1139. It is the fourth novel in The Cadfael Chronicles, first published in 1981 (1981 in literature). The story occurs during The Anarchy, in the English town of Shrewsbury.

It was adapted for television in 1997 by Central for ITV.

The book was received positively, saying that Cadfael was "stylishly authentic, though not quite as darkly inventive, as his previous three [novels]". Another review considered that while "Murder abounds in these early chronicles", the "predictable plotting is amply compensated for by the author's wonderful re-creation of the period".

== Plot introduction ==
In summer 1139, England is torn by strife between King Stephen and his cousin Empress Maud, during The Anarchy. King Stephen has the advantage now. From abroad Empress Maud is building support for a renewed attempt on the throne, with Earl Robert of Gloucester. Ranulf, Earl of Chester, is married to a daughter of Robert of Gloucester. Earl Ranulf is powerful in his own right, and has not yet chosen to stand with one or the other in this war for the crown of England. Hoping they have peace now their Castle is aligned with King Stephen, the monks of Shrewsbury Abbey prepare for the three-day annual fair in honour of their namesake saint, held on the feast of Saint Peter ad Vinculum.

== Plot summary ==
The Eve of the Fair

On 30 July 1139 at the Abbey of Saint Peter and Saint Paul, Geoffrey Corviser, the town provost speaks up at Chapter. He appeals unsuccessfully to Abbot Radulfus for a share of the money raised by the fair to repair the damages from the siege the prior year.

Cadfael meets Hugh Beringar and his wife Aline. He is called upon to translate for Rhodri, a Welsh-speaking merchant. During the encounter, Cadfael identifies Euan of Shotwick as an informant for Earl Ranulf. Soon after, Thomas of Bristol, a prominent wine merchant with ties to Robert of Gloucester, arrives by boat.

Young local men arrive to convince the visiting merchants to support the town's cause, without success. Pursuing the debate, Philip Corviser touches Thomas, who strikes him down with a staff. A riot breaks out. Philip partly recovers after the blow. He sees Thomas's niece, Emma, and is smitten on the spot. Philip and his friends flee. Thomas and Emma are endangered by rolling barrels. Ivo Corbière saves Emma.

Cadfael defends Philip to Hugh Beringar. Emma interrupts, searching for her missing uncle. Hugh, Cadfael and Ivo Corbière search for him. Corbière stumbles across his drunken archer, Turstan Fowler, and leaves the search to carry him to the abbey for a night in the punishment cells. The search ends when a barge arrives with the naked body of Thomas of Bristol, murdered with a dagger and dumped in the river.

During the Fair

Emma stays with Aline Beringar for the fair. Abbot Radulfus charges Cadfael to investigate the death. The sheriff holds Phillip in gaol. Thomas's boat is searched by persons unknown. Then Thomas's stall is searched, and the strongbox is stolen. Cadfael sees a pattern of something being sought and not found. Emma places a rose in full bloom in her uncle's coffin before it is sealed. Later, Cadfael sees one petal of that flower on the floor, revealing that Thomas's coffin has been searched.

Wealthy Corbière seems to be courting Emma. Emma seeks out Euan for some gloves. Euan is found dead by Cadfael and Rhodri, his neck broken. Hugh finds a bloody dagger in Euan's hand. The theory now is that Thomas and Euan of Shotwick were partisans who had come to the fair to conduct secret business, involving an item of great value. A third man kills both of them and searches in vain for the item.

Brother Mark treats a man for a knife wound to the arm, a groom to Corbière. Cadfael, Hugh, Sheriff Prestcote and Corbière confront Ewald, who shows his neatly bandaged arm. When asked to show his cotte, he jumps on Corbière's horse to escape. Corbière orders Turstan to loose an arrow at Ewald, who is killed.

Philip, released from jail, traces his path after he got drunk. At Wat's Tavern, Wat tells him that Turstan came twice to the tavern, first to look at the patrons, including Philip. On second visit, Turstan purchased a large bottle of hard liquor to carry away. He was sober and well dressed when he left the tavern. This is not what Turstan testified, nor how he appeared, at the hearing. Soon, Philip finds the scene of Thomas's murder.

After the Fair

Very early, Cadfael, Hugh and Philip visit the scene of Thomas's murder at the riverbank. Cadfael suggests that Turstan followed Philip. Once he ensured that Philip had no alibi, Turstan murdered Thomas. The liquor created the image he was drunk. At the guest house, Corbière offers to bring Emma to her home in Bristol, stopping at his home first. Emma accepts.

Cadfael realises that Corbière ordered the actions of Ewald and Turstan. When Corbière learned that Turstan failed, he sent Ewald to search Thomas's boat during the hearing. That same night Ewald and Turstan broke into Thomas's booth, again finding nothing. The next night they tried Euan's booth, killing him when he defended himself. Cadfael and Hugh work out Corbière's scheme to save himself by fooling Ewald and ordering Turstan to kill him. They both believe Emma is safe with Aline, but Philip knows that Corbière has been visiting Emma. Philip rushes to protect her, riding a merchant's horse to give chase. Aline updates Cadfael and Hugh at the Abbey; Emma and Corbière left three hours earlier and Philip is gone.

At Stanton Cobbold manor, Corbière locks Emma in a room while he searches her baggage. Corbière returns to demand the letter Thomas meant to deliver to Euan of Shotwick. Emma keeps the brazier between them. Corbière tells her the letter is from Robert of Gloucester to Earl Ranulf, urging him to support the Empress's cause and naming fifty nobles in Stephen's camp who secretly support her. Corbière will demand an earldom of the King for it. Emma removes the letter from her hair, unseen by Corbière, and then pushes it into the fire at the expense of burning her hand. Her uncle told her only that if not delivered it must be destroyed. She knocks over the unstable brazier, setting fire to the tapestries. Emma cannot escape the locked door. She lowers herself to the floor, slowly losing consciousness.

Philip rescues Emma. Hugh and Cadfael arrive. Cadfael tends to Philip's and Emma's injuries. Hugh arrests Turstan, unwary and unaware any knew his role in the murders. Corbière is killed by the fire, unmourned. Philip takes Emma to his parents' home in Shrewsbury. Emma sees the value of Philip, the opposite of the brutal Corbière, and a tradesperson like her. Tending Emma's burns, Cadfael says that if she has scars from these burns, she should "wear them like jewels". Radulfus summons the town provost, Philip's father, to chapter at the Abbey. Now he donates ten percent of returns from the fair to the rebuilding of the town.

The novel ends with the news that on 30 September 1139, Empress Maud invaded England, establishing herself at Arundel Castle in West Sussex. Earl Ranulf of Chester did nothing to aid her cause.

== Characters ==
- Brother Cadfael: At the time of Saint Peter's Fair he is 59 years old and 16 years a monk. He is Welsh, speaking both his native language and English, born near Trefriw in Gwynedd.
- Brother Mark: Young assistant to Brother Cadfael in herbarium. This is his first annual fair, as none happened in the rough summer of 1138. Recently he took his final vows, giving up the world at 18, and is sure he wants to be a priest. He is short due to short commons while living with an uncle, a hard master who pushed him to the Abbey at age 16. He was introduced in Monk's Hood.
- Abbot Radulfus: Head of the abbey, a real historical person in this otherwise fictional tale, just half a year in office, he is learning the townspeople. He is described as tall with silver hair and somewhat authoritarian in his manner. He is a shrewd man, knowing his duty to the Abbey and the secular law. His preferment as Abbot he owes both to the church and to the King.
- Sheriff Prestcote: Sheriff of Shropshire. He was appointed Sheriff by King Stephen and was introduced in One Corpse Too Many.
- Hugh Beringar: Deputy Sheriff of Shropshire, second to Sheriff Prestcote. He became Deputy in One Corpse Too Many in 1138. He holds manors at Maesbury in Shropshire. About 24 years old, he married Aline Siward a year earlier. He is an effective man of law and justice who respects Brother Cadfael, and in some ways thinks like him. He makes some shrewd judgments but sees he was fooled by the demeanor of Corbière, adding to his store of knowledge of the evil of men. Beringar, like his Sheriff, holds with King Stephen.
- Aline Beringar: Cherished newlywed wife of Hugh, in early stage of first pregnancy. She is a beautiful woman with hair of gold, who brought two manors to their marriage. She and Hugh stay in the Abbey guest house so she can purchase items needed for the expected baby. She is about 20 years old and was introduced in One Corpse Too Many.
- Rhodri ap Huw: Cheerful Welsh merchant of wool, honey, mead, and other goods who requests a translator of the Abbey. Radulfus sends Cadfael to serve that role. He shares much in Welsh with Cadfael on other vendors at the fair, at every point in the story. By the end, Cadfael knows Rhodri speaks many languages; asking the Abbey for a translator allows him to eavesdrop more effectively for the benefit of Owain Gwynedd, the Welsh prince. He observed that "Nowhere is so solitary as in the middle of a marketplace." Rhodri will tell Owain that Ranulf will be fully occupied with Chester, so direct his own raids in other directions. He is from Mold on the River Alyn, in northeast Wales, east of Cadfael's birthplace, and is about 50.
- Thomas of Bristol: A large gentleman with a red face and bushy eyebrows, fashionably dressed. He is a wealthy and powerful importer of wine and luxury sweets from the East via the port of Bristol in the West Country, linked to Robert of Gloucester. Three men sail with him: young Gregory, porter Warin, and journeyman Roger Dod. He is the first murder victim.
- Emma Vernold: Niece of Thomas of Bristol, 18 or 19 years old, attractive with blue-black hair and blue eyes. This is her third journey with her uncle as he travels to buy and sell his goods. Her late father was a stonemason married to the sister of Thomas, also deceased. She was raised in Thomas's household since age 8. She is heiress both to her father and to her uncle, accustomed to the wealth of a tradesman family (in contrast to landed wealth). She has presence of mind in her time of great loss and change.
- Euan of Shotwick: A master glove maker and important man in the court of Earl Ranulf, for whom he is an "intelligencer". He is the second man murdered in this story. Euan is described as a "meagre fellow" who trusts no one, is well dressed and clean shaven with a "mincing walk".
- Philip Corviser: Son of the respected town provost and skilled boot maker Geoffrey Corviser. He is a young hothead. Their last name indicates their trade of making shoes from leather. Physically he is "a gangling lad, not yet in command of his long limbs, being barely twenty and only just at the end of his growing". He has "a thick thatch of reddish dark hair and a decent, homely face".
- Edwy Bellecote: Son of Martin Bellecote, master carpenter. He was of the party of young men seeking support of the traders at the fair. He is not yet 16, so Hugh sent him home to his father rather than jailing him. Both were introduced in Monk's Hood.
- Ivo Corbière: A wealthy and handsome lordling of 28 or 29 with dark gold hair and slender build. He owns multiple manors. He is distant kin to Ranulf of Chester. He attends the fair to furnish a manor in Cheshire, where most of his holdings lie. His one manor in Shropshire is Stanton Cobbold. He stays at the Abbey as a guest. He is a man of fine manners, almost silky. At the end, he tells Emma she is a "little shopkeeper's girl of no account."
- Ewald: Stocky, bearded man, a villein groom in Ivo Corbière's service. He is one of three murdered in this book, for what he might have said about his master. Directed to search several places by Corbière, he stole portable items of value for himself.
- Arald: Young groom in Ivo Corbière's service.
- Turstan Fowler: Falconer and archer in Ivo Corbière's retinue, in his mid 30s. One of his weapons is an arbalest, with which he is very accurate. He is a man with no aversion to killing outside the context of battle; "like master like man".

== Major themes ==
Saint Peter's Fair is a historical mystery set in 1139 during The Anarchy, a nineteen-year period in English history. Its themes are intrigue and espionage in a medieval setting.

== Literary significance and reception ==
The 2000 reprint of Saint Peter's Fair quotes a Sunday Times review: "A more attractive and prepossessing detective would be hard to find".

Kirkus Reviews finds this novel authentic but not as clever as the first three. "Brother Cadfael returns in another 12th-century mystery—as stylishly authentic, though not quite as darkly inventive, as his previous three." They noted the "colorful, convincing details on the workings of a medieval fair" and concluded it was "a graceful and informative, if not particularly mysterious, case for Peters' engaging, herb-gardening monk."

Publishers Weekly reviewed a 1991 audio book of this and the next novel in the series in one article, liking the historical setting more than the plots. They felt that readers "are likely to solve these mysteries long before the insightful Benedictine monk, but predictable plotting is amply compensated for by the author's wonderful re-creation of the period". They commended the narration by actor Stephen Thorne.

== Setting in history ==
The novel is set in the real town of Shrewsbury in Shropshire, England. The body of the first murder victim is found in the Severn river near Atcham. The first two victims are merchants with goods to sell, who hold similar political views, favouring the Empress. The fair at the Abbey was meant to be a neutral meeting place to get a message from Gloucester north to Chester in the efforts to gain support from a powerful man; the places are about 120 miles apart on modern roads. Thomas of Bristol came by river, passing Gloucester, while Euan of Shotwick came by land to the fair. As Cadfael noted in a conversation with Rhodri ap Huw, Rhodri's home in Mold in Wales is very close to Chester, and to Shotwick, teasing him that he might be an intelligencer for Ranulf, instead of Owain Gwynedd (prince of Gwynedd principality).

The story takes place in the year 1139, during The Anarchy, a term referring to the 19-year civil war between King Stephen and the Empress Maud.

The novel begins during a period of relative quiet in England, with Stephen crowned King since 1135. His cousin, the surviving legitimate child of the prior King Henry, Empress Maud is in Anjou attempting to build support for her invasion, aided in England by her half-brother Robert of Gloucester. The contention arose from Henry's effort to gain support from the nobility to honour his daughter as Queen on his death, as his only legitimate son had died in an accident on the White Ship in 1120. When Henry died, Stephen acted quickly to gain the crown while Maud stayed in Anjou with her husband and children. Many who had taken the oath with the dead king Henry readily gave their allegiance to Stephen. Others felt that first oath to bind them. Precisely why this split endured is never clear and continually analysed. Perhaps England was not ready for a queen; perhaps her second marriage with Geoffrey of Anjou (arranged by her father) rankled; perhaps the affable Stephen was more popular and Maud too strident; perhaps the barons wanted to be more certain of their own lands; perhaps other reasons set off the long period of strife, which was not settled until King Stephen died. The novel concludes with Empress Maud invading England on 30 September 1139 and taking Arundel Castle in West Sussex.

Abbott Radulfus was the real Abbott at this Benedictine monastery, who began in 1138 as the replacement of Abbott Heribert. In historical records he is sometimes called Ranulf.

The Saint Peter's Fair was allowed to the Abbey as a way for it to earn revenue, here 38 shillings. The three-day fair was granted either by Earl Roger or King Henry I. The Lammas Fair was allowed in the same fashion, originally on 1 August, become 12 August after the change of the calendar in 1752. The Charter fair was a primary method of buying and selling trade goods in this century (the 12th) as part of the growing economy, as well as a benefit to the Abbey, from rents, fees, tolls.

== Publication history ==
- 1981, United Kingdom, Macmillan, ISBN 978-0-333-31050-2, May 1981, Hardback
- 1981, USA, William Morrow, ISBN 978-0-688-00667-9, November 1981, Hardback
- 1983, United Kingdom, Ulversoft Large Print Books, ISBN 978-0-7089-0933-1, March 1981, Hardback
- 1984, USA, Fawcett Books, ISBN 978-0-449-20540-2, June 1984, Paperback
- 1994, United Kingdom, Warner Futura, ISBN 978-0-7088-1104-7, 1994, Paperback
- 1996, United Kingdom, Sphere, ISBN 978-0-7515-1400-1, 1 February 1996, Paperback
- 1998, USA, Thorndike Press, ISBN 978-0-7862-1074-9, April 1998, Paperback
- 1998, United Kingdom, Chivers Press, ISBN 978-0-7540-1088-3, 1 April 1998, Hardback
- 1998, United Kingdom, Chivers Large Print, ISBN 978-0-7540-2063-9, December 1998, Paperback
- 1999, United Kingdom, Time Warner UK, ISBN 978-0-7515-1104-8, 19 May 1999, Paperback
- 2007, United Kingdom, Hodder & Stoughton, ISBN 9781844561810, 5 April 2007, Audio book on CD

As of 2013, eleven paperback editions have been published, the most recent in October 2011 (ISBN 9780751547078 UK edition, Publisher Sphere).

There are thirteen versions of audiobooks, published from May 1991 to July 2013 (ISBN 9781433264801, Publisher Blackstone Audiobooks).

== Television adaptation ==
Saint Peter's Fair was the ninth Brother Cadfael novel to be adapted for television. It is the fourth novel in the series; five stories that follow this one in the novel sequence were shown before this one. It was the second episode of the third season, filmed on location in Hungary in 1996 and produced in Britain by Central Independent Television for ITV. The Central television series starred Derek Jacobi as Cadfael, first airing in 1997 on ITV.

== External References ==
- Saint Peter's Fair at IMDb
