= Edith Pargeter =

British writer (1913–1995)

Edith Pargeter OBE BEM
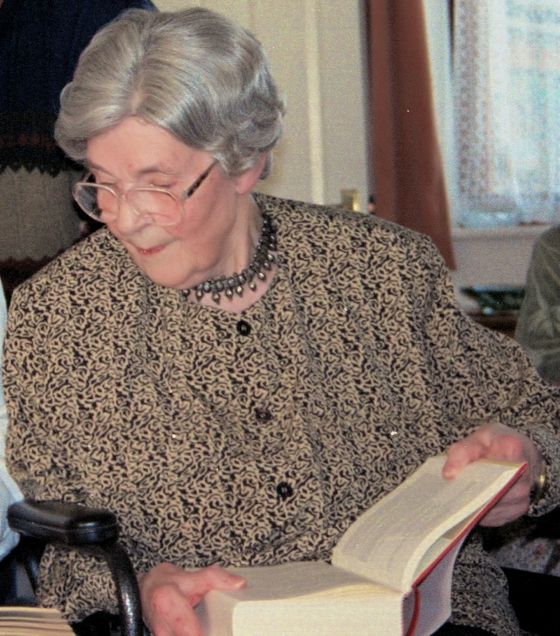
- Edith Pargeter in 1995
- Born: Edith Mary Pargeter; 28 September 1913; Horsehay, Shropshire, England
- Died: 14 October 1995 (aged 82); Madeley, Shropshire, England
- Citizenship: British
- Education: Dawley Church of England School; Coalbrookdale High School for Girls
- Occupation: Author
- Writing career
- Pen name: Ellis Peters; John Redfern; Jolyon Carr; Peter Benedict
- Period: 1936–1990s
- Genres: historical fiction; mysteries; nonfiction works about Shrewsbury; translations from Czech
- Notable works: "The Brother Cadfael Chronicles"; the George Felse mysteries; the "Heaven Tree" trilogy
- Notable awards: OBE; British Crime Writers Association; Mystery Writers of America

Edith Mary Pargeter (28 September 1913 – 14 October 1995), also known by her pen name Ellis Peters, was an English author of works in many categories, especially history and historical fiction, and was also honoured for her translations of Czech classics. She is probably best known for her murder mysteries, both historical and modern, and especially for her medieval detective series The Cadfael Chronicles.

== Personal life ==
Pargeter was born in the village of Horsehay (Shropshire, England), daughter of Edmund Valentine Pargeter (known as Ted) and Edith nee Hordley. Her father was a clerk at the local Horsehay Company ironworks. She later moved with her parents to Dawley where she was educated at Dawley Church of England School and the old Coalbrookdale High School for Girls. She had Welsh ancestry, and many of her short stories and books (both fiction and non-fiction) are set in Wales and its borderlands, or have Welsh protagonists.

After leaving school she worked as a temporary labour exchange clerk, then as an assistant at a chemist's shop in Dawley, during which time her first novel, Hortensius, Friend of Nero, was published in 1936. During World War II, she enlisted in the Women's Royal Naval Service (the "Wrens") in 1940. She worked in an administrative role as a teleprinter operator at Devonport, and then at the Western Approaches Headquarters at Derby House, Liverpool. She reached the rank of petty officer by 1 January 1944 when she was awarded the British Empire Medal (BEM) in the New Year Honours.

In 1947 Pargeter visited Czechoslovakia in a Workers' Educational Association party and became fascinated by the Czech language and culture. She wrote two books about then-Czechoslovakia: "The Fair Young Phoenix" and "The Coast of Bohemia". She became fluent in Czech and published award-winning translations of Czech poetry and prose into English. She translated books by Jan Neruda, Božena Němcová, and Karel Hynek Mácha, as well as books by 20th-century writers such as Bohumil Hrabal, Ivan Klíma, Ladislav Vančura, and Nobel Prize Laureate in Literature, the poet Jaroslav Seifert.

She was an active Labour Party supporter until, with her brother Ellis Pargeter (a local councillor in Dawley), she left the party in 1949 because they believed that it had deserted socialist principles.

== Writing career ==
She devoted the rest of her life to writing, both nonfiction and well-researched fiction. She never attended university but became a self-taught scholar in areas that interested her, especially Shropshire and Wales. Birmingham University gave her an honorary master's degree. She never married, but did fall in love with a Czech man. She remained friends with him after he married another woman. She was pleased that she could support herself with her writing from the time after the Second World War until her death.

Pargeter wrote under a number of pseudonyms; it was under the name Ellis Peters that she wrote her later crime stories, especially the highly popular series of Brother Cadfael medieval mysteries, featuring a Benedictine monk at the Abbey in Shrewsbury. That pseudonym was drawn from the name of her brother, Ellis, and a version of the name of the daughter of friends, Petra. Many of the novels were made into films for television. Although she won her first award for a novel written in 1963, her greatest fame and sales came with the Cadfael Chronicles, which began in 1977. At the time that the 19th novel was published, sales of the series exceeded 6.5 million. The Cadfael Chronicles drew international attention to Shrewsbury and its history, and greatly increased tourism to the town. In an interview in 1993, she mentioned her own work before the Second World War as a chemist's assistant, where they prepared many of the compounds they sold. "We used to make bottled medicine that we compounded specially, with ingredients like gentian, rosemary, horehound. You never see that nowadays; those tinctures are never prescribed. They often had bitters of some sort in them, a taste I rather liked. Some of Cadfael's prescriptions come out of those years."

Her Cadfael novels show great appreciation for the ideals of medieval Catholic Christianity, but also a recognition of its weaknesses, such as quarrels over the finer points of theology (The Heretic's Apprentice), and the desire of the church to own more and more land and wealth (Monk's Hood, Saint Peter's Fair, The Rose Rent).

== Later life ==
In 1992 her mobility began to decline after a fall during a service being televised for Songs of Praise at Shrewsbury Abbey. She had a further fall in 1994 at home that led to the amputation of a leg at Princess Royal Hospital, Telford.

She died at her last home in Glendinning Way, Madeley, Shropshire, in October 1995 at the age of 82, having recently returned home from hospital following a stroke. On 14 September 1997, a new stained glass window depicting St Benedict was installed in Shrewsbury Abbey and was dedicated to the memory of Edith Pargeter, with funds raised by donations from admirers of the author.

She is remembered in her home town with a residential road named after her. Ellis Peters Drive sits off Southall Road between Aqueduct and Brookside in Telford.

== Recognition ==
The Mystery Writers of America gave Pargeter their Edgar Award in 1963 for Death and the Joyful Woman. In 1980, the British Crime Writers' Association awarded her the Silver Dagger for Monk's Hood. In 1993 she won the Cartier Diamond Dagger, an annual award given by the CWA to authors who have made an outstanding lifetime contribution to the field of crime and mystery writing. Pargeter was appointed Officer of the Order of the British Empire (OBE) "for services to Literature" in the 1994 New Year Honours. To commemorate Pargeter's life and work, in 1999 the CWA established their Ellis Peters Historical Dagger award (later called the Ellis Peters Historical Award) for the best historical crime novel of the year.

Pargeter's Cadfael Chronicles are often credited for popularizing what would later become known as the historical mystery.

== Adaptations ==
Her novella The Assize of the Dying was adapted as the 1958 film The Spaniard's Curse. Directed by Ralph Kemplen, it starred Tony Wright, Lee Patterson, Michael Hordern, Susan Beaumont and Henry Oscar.

Death and the Joyful Woman was adapted for The Alfred Hitchcock Hour in 1963. Directed by John Brahm, it starred Gilbert Roland, Laraine Day and Don Galloway.

Death and the Joyful Woman was again adapted, this time for Czech television, as Smrt a blazená paní (Death and the Blessed Lady), directed by Pavel Háša.

Thirteen of her Cadfael novels were adapted for television as Cadfael between 1994 and 1998. Episodes were adapted by Russell Lewis, and starred Derek Jacobi, Julian Firth. Michael Culver and Terence Hardiman.

== Bibliography ==
=== As Edith Pargeter ===
==== Jim Benison a.k.a. The Second World War Trilogy ====
1. The Eighth Champion of Christendom (1945)
2. Reluctant Odyssey (1946)
3. Warfare Accomplished (1947)

==== The Heaven Tree Trilogy ====
1. The Heaven Tree (1960)
2. The Green Branch (1962) (1230 William De Braose, a Norman Marcher Lord was hanged for an affair with Joan, lady of Wales, the wife of Prince Llywelyn ab Iorwerth.)
3. The Scarlet Seed (1963)

==== The Brothers of Gwynedd Quartet ====
4 novels about Llewelyn the Last:

1. Sunrise in the West (1974)
2. The Dragon at Noonday (1975)
3. The Hounds of Sunset (1976)
4. Afterglow and Nightfall (1977)

==== Other ====
- Hortensius, Friend of Nero (1936)
- Iron-Bound (1936)
- The City Lies Four-Square (1939)
- Ordinary People (1941) (a.k.a. People of My Own)
- She Goes to War (1942)
- The Fair Young Phoenix (1948)
- By Firelight (1948) (US title: By This Strange Fire)
- The Coast of Bohemia (1950) (non-fiction: an account of a journey in Czechoslovakia)
- Lost Children (1951)
- Tales of the Little Quarter (1951). Translation from Czech of the collection by Jan Neruda
- Most Loving Mere Folly (1953)
- The Rough Magic (1953)
- The Soldier at the Door (1954)
- A Means of Grace (1956)
- The Assize of the Dying (1958).
  - 'The Assize of the Dying'; and 'Aunt Helen' ('The Assize of the Dying' was filmed, as The Spaniard's Curse, also in 1958)
- Legends of Old Bohemia (1964). Translation from Czech of the book by Alois Jirásek
- The Lily Hand and other stories (1965): 1995); see pseudonym Ellis Peters (books) (chron.):
  - 'A Grain of Mustard Seed', 'Light-Boy', 'Grim Fairy Tale', 'Trump of Doom', 'The Man Who Met Himself', 'The Linnet in the Garden', 'How Beautiful is Youth', 'All Souls' Day', 'The Cradle', 'My Friend the Enemy', 'The Lily Hand, 'A Question of Faith', 'The Purple Children', 'I am a Seagull', 'Carnival Night', 'The Ultimate Romeo and Juliet'
- A Bloody Field by Shrewsbury (1972) (US title: The Bloody Field)
- The Marriage of Meggotta (1979) (about Margaret de Burgh, daughter of Hubert de Burgh, 2nd earl of Kent, who saved Prince Arthur the first time King John tried to have him killed)

===== Non-fiction =====
- How to destroy the human personality. Birmingham Daily Post, 28 August 1968. Translation of an article by Ivo Pondelicek

=== Short stories ===
==== Brambleridge Tales ====
1. Late Apple Harvest Everywoman's, October 1938
2. Poppy Juice Everywoman's, November 1938
3. Christmas Roses Everywoman's, December 1938
4. Under the Big Top Everywoman's, January 1939
5. Meet of the Clear Water Hunt Everywoman's, February 1939
6. Lambs in the Meadow Everywoman's, March 1939
7. April Foolishness Everywoman's, April 1939
8. Happy Ending Everywoman's, May 1939

==== Others ====
- Mightiest in the Mightiest. Everywoman's, March 1936.
- Ere I Forget Thee. Everywoman's, July 1936.
- Coronation Stairs. Everywoman's, March 1937.
- Santa Claus Would Understand. Everywoman's, December 1937.
- Perfect Love. Twenty-Story Magazine, December 1937.
- Wrong Turning. Everywoman's, April 1938.
- Under the Big Top. Everywoman's, January 1939.
- Forty-Eight Hours Leave. Everywoman's, December 1939.
- The Duchess and the Doll. The Uncertain Element: An Anthology of Fantastic Conceptions, edited by Kay Dick, 1950.
- A Girl of Indiscretion. John Bull, 19 October 1953.
- Assize of the Dying. Sydney Daily Herald, serialised daily from 23 October to 11 December 1954; and, as The Assize of the Dying, serialised in Good Housekeeping, January to March 1955. Collected in The Assize of the Dying.
- How Beautiful Is Youth. Australian Women's Weekly, 20 April 1955. Collected in The Lily Hand.
- Dead Mountain Lion. Australian Women's Weekly, 4 April 1956. Collected in The Trinity Cat.
- A Lift into Colmar. Australian Women's Weekly, 6, 13, 20 and 27 March 1957. Collected in The Trinity Cat.
- Young Man with a Pram. Australian Women's Weekly, 2 October 1957. Collected in The Trinity Cat.
- The Linnet in the Garden. Australian Women's Weekly, 12 February 1958. Collected in The Lily Hand.
- A Question of Faith. Argosy, February 1958, as by Edith Pargeter.
- Aunt Helen. Australian Women's Weekly, 30 April and 7 May 1958. Collected in The Assize of the Dying and The Lily Hand.
- The Purple Children. Australian Women's Weekly, 2 July 1958. Collected in The Lily Hand.
- The Man Who Met Himself. Argosy, November 1958, as by Edith Pargeter.
- Change of Heart. Argosy, January 1959, as by Edith Pargeter.
- An Image of Grace. Australian Women's Weekly, 5 August 1959.
- Chance Meeting. Australian Women's Weekly, 2 September 1959. Collected in The Lily Hand.
- The Squared Circle. Australian Women's Weekly, 16 December 1959. Collected in The Lily Hand.
- Hostile Witness. Australian Women's Weekly, 5 April 1961. Collected in The Trinity Cat.
- The Cradle. Australian Women's Weekly, 20 December 1961. Collected in The Lily Hand.
- Guide to Doom. This Week, 10 November 1963.
- The Chestnut Calf. This Week, 29 December 1963.
- O Gold, O Girl!. Argosy, 31 March 1965, as by Edith Pargeter. Collected in The Trinity Cat as 'The Golden Girl'.
- With Regrets. This Week, 30 May 1965. Collected in The Trinity Cat.
- A Grain of Mustard Seed. This Week, 30 June 1966. Collected in The Trinity Cat as 'The Mustard Seed'.
- Maiden Garland. Winter's Crimes 1, 1969. Collected in The Trinity Cat.
- The Trinity Cat. Winter's Crimes 8, 1976. Collected in The Trinity Cat.
- Come to Dust. Winter's Crimes 16, 1984. Collected in The Trinity Cat.
- Let Nothing You Dismay!. Winter's Crimes 21, 1989. Collected in The Trinity Cat.
- The Frustration Dream. 2nd Culprit, 1993. Collected in The Trinity Cat.
- The Man Who Held up the Roof. Collected in The Trinity Cat. Details of any earlier publication unknown.
- At the House of the Gentle Wind. Collected in The Trinity Cat. Details of any earlier publication unknown.
- Breathless Beauty. Collected in The Trinity Cat. Details of any earlier publication unknown.
- A Present for Ivo. Collected in The Trinity Cat. Details of any earlier publication unknown.

=== As Ellis Peters ===
==== George Felse and Family ====
1. Fallen into the Pit (1951) (originally published under her own name)
2. Death and the Joyful Woman (1961) (Edgar Award for Best Novel, 1963)
3. Flight of a Witch (1964)
4. A Nice Derangement of Epitaphs (1965) (US title: Who Lies Here?). Serialised as The Sands Have a Secret. Woman's Realm from 5 September to 10 October 1964
5. The Piper on the Mountain (1966)
6. Black is the Colour of my True Love's Heart (1967). Serialised Australian Women's Weekly, 22 and 27 December 1967 ISBN 9781784972844
7. The Grass-Widow's Tale (1968). Serialised Australian Women's Weekly, 29 May and 5 June 1968
8. The House of Green Turf (1969). Serialised Australian Women's Weekly, 15, 22 and 29 January 1969
9. Mourning Raga (1969)
10. The Knocker on Death's Door (1970). Serialised Australian Women's Weekly, 12, 19 and 26 August 1970
11. Death to the Landlords! (1972)
12. City of Gold and Shadows (1973)
13. Rainbow's End (1978)

==== Brother Cadfael ====
1. A Rare Benedictine: The Advent of Brother Cadfael (September 1988, set in 1120)
2. A Morbid Taste for Bones (published in August 1977, set in 1137)
3. One Corpse Too Many (July 1979, set in August 1138)
4. Monk's Hood (August 1980, set in December 1138)
5. Saint Peter's Fair (May 1981, set in July 1139)
6. The Leper of Saint Giles (August 1981, set in October 1139)
7. The Virgin in the Ice (April 1982, set in November 1139)
8. The Sanctuary Sparrow (January 1983, set in the Spring of 1140) (Note: This and other First Edition offerings indicate 1983 for the Macmillan edition)
9. The Devil's Novice (August 1983, set in September 1140)
10. Dead Man's Ransom (April 1984, set in February 1141)
11. The Pilgrim of Hate (September 1984, set in May 1141)
12. An Excellent Mystery (June 1985, set in August 1141)
13. The Raven in the Foregate (February 1986, set in December 1141)
14. The Rose Rent (October 1986, set in June 1142)
15. The Hermit of Eyton Forest (June 1987, set in October 1142)
16. The Confession of Brother Haluin (March 1988, set in December 1142)
17. The Heretic's Apprentice (February 1989, set in June 1143)
18. The Potter's Field (September 1989, set in August 1143)
19. The Summer of the Danes (April 1991, set in April 1144)
20. The Holy Thief (August 1992, set in February 1145)
21. Brother Cadfael's Penance (May 1994, set in November 1145)

==== Others ====
- Holiday With Violence (1952). First published under her own name.
- Death Mask (1959)
- The Will and the Deed (1960) (US title: Where There's a Will)
- Funeral of Figaro (1962)
- The Horn of Roland (1974)
- Never Pick Up Hitchhikers! (1976)
- Shropshire (non-fiction, with Roy Morgan) (1992) ISBN 978-0-86299-996-4
- Strongholds and Sanctuaries : The Borderland of England and Wales (non-fiction, with Roy Morgan) (1993) ISBN 978-0747278542
- The Trinity Cat and Other Mysteries (Crippen & Landru, 2006), short stories (Dead mountain lion, A lift into Colmar, At the house of the gentle wind, Breathless beauty, A present for Ivo, Guide to doom, The golden girl, Hostile witness, With regrets, Maiden Garland, The trinity cat, Come to dust, Let nothing you dismay!, The frustration dream, The man who held up the roof)

=== As John Redfern ===
- The Victim Needs a Nurse (1940)

=== As Jolyon Carr ===
==== Novels ====
- Murder in the Dispensary (1938)
- Freedom for Two (1939)
- Masters of the Parachute Mail (1940)
- Death Comes by Post (1940)

==== Uncollected short stories ====
- Come In – and Welcome. Everywoman's, January 1938

=== As Peter Benedict ===
- Day Star (1937)
