= Monk's-Hood =

1980 book by Ellis Peters

- First edition
- Author: Ellis Peters
- Illustrator: Boscove
- Series: The Cadfael Chronicles
- Genre: Mystery novel
- Publisher: Macmillan
- Publication date: 1980
- Media type: Print (Hardcover, Paperback) & audio book
- Pages: 224
- Awards: Silver Dagger 1980
- ISBN: 978-0-333-29410-9
- OCLC: 7374059
- Dewey Decimal: 823/.912 19
- LC Class: PR6031.A49 M6 1980
- Preceded by: One Corpse Too Many
- Followed by: Saint Peter's Fair

Monk's-Hood is a medieval mystery novel by Ellis Peters, set in December 1138. It is the third novel in The Cadfael Chronicles. It was first published in 1980 (1980 in literature).

It was adapted for television in 1994 by Central for ITV.

Gervase Bonel dies from monkshood oil put in his food. Brother Cadfael made the oil. Who used it as poison? Cadfael assesses the motives of Bonel's family and household staff, including his Welsh natural son and his stepson, and deals with Bonel's widow who was once Cadfael's sweetheart long ago. The sergeant views the case differently from Cadfael.

This novel received the Silver Dagger Award in 1980 from the UK's Crime Writers Association. The author was commended by one reviewer for her ability to draw characters who are distinctly medieval, "not modern men and women masquerading in medieval garb," while dealing with fine points of medieval Welsh law. Another reviewer missed the lively character of the second novel, Hugh Beringar, wishing him to be more involved in this plot, yet saying "Peters does wonders with the medieval scene and with complex character relationships."

== Plot summary ==
In early December 1138, Abbot Heribert of Shrewsbury Abbey is summoned to a Legatine council in London and his authority is suspended. The Abbey's business is also postponed, with one exception: Gervase Bonel, who has ceded his manorial estate at Mallilie to the Abbey in return for a small house where his needs in retirement will be provided, is allowed to move his household before the charter is signed. All expect that Heribert or his successor will complete the agreement after the council.

Prior Robert is left in charge of the Abbey. He receives gifts meant for the Abbot, including a fat partridge which he shares with Bonel, having his cook send a portion with dinner. Bonel is taken ill immediately after eating it. Brother Cadfael the herbalist and Brother Edmund the infirmarer run to his aid but cannot save him. Cadfael recognises Bonel's widow as Richildis Vaughan, to whom he was informally betrothed over 40 years earlier. He realises that the sauce in which the partridge was served was poisoned by a liniment he made. Its active ingredient is monkshood (Wolfsbane), deadly if ingested.

The murder is reported to Shrewsbury Castle. Sheriff Prestcote sends the unsubtle Sergeant Will Warden to investigate. As Prior Robert ate the other half of the partridge without ill effects, suspicion falls on Bonel's household. Richildis was never alone with the partridge. Aelfric, who carried the dishes from the kitchen, bears a grudge as Bonel deprived him of free status and made him a villein. Neither the maid, Aldith, nor Meurig, an illegitimate son of Bonel who is apprenticed to Richildis' son-in-law master carpenter Martin Bellecote, have any apparent motive. Edwin Gurney, Richildis' son from her first marriage, was present at part of the meal, but stormed out after a quarrel before Bonel ate the partridge. He and Meurig had come separately from the Abbey's infirmary, where Meurig used the monkshood oil to massage his great uncle, the aged Brother Rhys. Edwin's motive for murdering Bonel is plain to the sergeant. Because the charter with the Abbey is not completed, Edwin will inherit Mallilie.

Warden fails to find Edwin. Late that night Edwin and his same-age nephew, Edwy Bellecote, meet Cadfael in his workshop. By pretending that Bonel was attacked with a sword or dagger, Cadfael establishes that Edwin does not know how Bonel died and is innocent of poisoning him. He disguises Edwin in a monk's habit and conceals him in one of the Abbey's barns. Cadfael suggests that Warden search for the vial which the murderer used to carry the oil. Warden reports that Edwin was seen to throw something glittery into the River Severn. Cadfael questions Edwin, who says that he threw a carved wooden reliquary, a gift intended for Bonel, into the river after their quarrel.

That night, Cadfael visits Richildis to ask if there are other legitimate heirs. If Edwin does not inherit, Mallilie would revert to Bonel's overlord. Richildis reminisces about her former relations with Cadfael. Brother Jerome, Prior Robert's sanctimonious clerk, is eavesdropping outside the door. At Chapter, Jerome betrays Cadfael's and Richildis' former relationship. Prior Robert forbids Cadfael, who is bound by his vow of obedience, to leave the Abbey's precincts.

The same morning, Edwin is discovered in the barn by Abbey servants, and flees on Bonel's fine horse. The boy on the horse is captured after a chase lasting all day. Summoned to give spiritual comfort to the boy, Cadfael finds Edwy Bellecote, who distracted the authorities while Edwin escaped. Deputy Sheriff Hugh Beringar allows Edwy to return to his family on parole. Cadfael sends his assistant, Brother Mark, to search around Bonel's house for any bottle which might have held the poison. Mark finds it in a place where Edwin Gurney could not have thrown it, further proving his innocence to Cadfael.

The Abbey's steward at Mallilie sends word that a brother at a remote sheepfold at Rhydycroesau in Wales has fallen ill. Cadfael realises that Mallilie's location near or within Wales alters motives. Before departing to tend the sick brother, he questions the aged Brother Rhys, uncle to Meurig's mother, about local customs around Mallilie. Beringar is absent, searching for the reliquary which Edwin threw into the river, and Cadfael does not confide his discoveries to the sceptical Sergeant Warden.

At Rhydycroesau, the ailing brother soon recovers. Cadfael visits the manor at Mallilie and then kinfolk of Brother Rhys. At the house of Rhys's brother-in-law, Ifor ap Morgan, he discovers Edwin in hiding. Sergeant Warden follows Cadfael from Mallilie, and takes Edwin into custody. Cadfael now has one chance to get justice for Gervase Bonel, at the Commote court at Llansilin the next day.

At the court, Meurig makes his claim for Mallilie, producing written proof of his paternity. The manor lies within Wales; under Welsh law, a recognised son, born in or out of wedlock, has an over-riding claim to his father's property. Cadfael intervenes, stating that Meurig cannot inherit as he murdered Bonel. He produces the vial and challenges Meurig to display his scrip (linen pouch) to show where the strongly scented oil leaked into it. Meurig flees. Cadfael asks the court to send word of Meurig's guilt to Shrewsbury and returns to Rhydycroesau.

As Cadfael expects, Meurig is waiting for him armed with a knife. Meurig does not take his revenge on Cadfael, but instead confesses to Bonel's murder. He knew from an early age that he would inherit Mallilie under Welsh law, but Bonel's agreement to hand it to Shrewsbury Abbey would put it out of reach. Wanting to gain the manor before the charter was signed, he took some of Cadfael's rubbing oil from the infirmary. Having overheard Aldith say that the partridge was a gift for Bonel, he added the oil to the sauce while briefly alone in the kitchen of Bonel's house. After Warden left the house to search for Edwin, he threw the vial out of the window of the house. Not wanting to take a life for a life, Cadfael tells him his penance is to live a long life, doing as much good as he can. He directs Meurig to escape on the horse at the sheepfold.

Three days after Christmas, Cadfael returns to Shrewsbury to find the monks eagerly awaiting Abbot Heribert's return. When Heribert arrives, he says he has returned as a humble brother to end his days there. He then dashes Prior Robert's hopes of succeeding him by introducing Radulfus, their new Abbot appointed by the Legatine Council. The new abbot lets Edwin declare Aelfric free, but the steward will run Mallilie until Edwin is of age to inherit it. Cadfael is content that Edwin and his mother will move there, and depart from his life.

== Characters ==
- Brother Cadfael: Herbalist monk at Shrewsbury Abbey,
- Abbot Heribert: Head of the Abbey of Saint Peter and Saint Paul for eleven years. Real historical person.
- Prior Robert Pennant: Priest and monk at the Abbey. Real historical person.
- Brother Jerome: Clerk to Prior Robert.
- Brother Richard: Sub-prior. He is an easygoing man, who takes over the Prior's duties while Heribert is away.
- Brother Petrus: Cook for the Abbot's house.
- Brother Edmund: Infirmarer, in charge of the Abbey's hospital.
- Brother Mark: A novice recently assigned to Cadfael as his assistant in the herbarium.
- Alberic of Ostia: Benedictine monk and Cardinal-bishop of Ostia, legate come from Rome to show papal approval of King Stephen as sovereign of England, and convene a legatine council in London to reorganise the local church, including election of a new archbishop for Canterbury. He is a real historical person and the council did occur.
- Gervase Bonel: Second husband of the widowed Richildis, stepfather to her son.
- Richildis, Mistress Bonel: Wife of Gervase Bonel.
- Aelfric: Man servant to the Bonel household.
- Aldith: Serving girl to the Bonel household.
- Edwin Gurney: The son of Richildis and her first husband.
- Brother Rhys: Older monk of Welsh birth and still speaks the language.
- Meurig: Young man 24 or 25 years old, born to a Welsh mother and English father.
- Gilbert Prestcote: Sheriff of Shropshire.
- Sibil Bellecote: Wife of Martin, daughter of Richildis and Eward Gurney.
- Martin Bellecote: Master carpenter in Shrewsbury.
- Edwy Bellecote: Son of Martin and Sibil Bellecote.
- Hugh Beringar: Recently appointed Deputy Sheriff of Shropshire by King Stephen.
- Sergeant William Warden: Officer of the law sent by Sheriff Prestcote when Bonel was found murdered.
- Lay Brothers Barnabas and Simon: Two men living at an Abbey sheepfold near Rhydycroesau, by Oswestry.
- Cynfrith ap Rhys: A first cousin of Brother Rhys, but much younger, perhaps by 20 years.
- Ifor ap Morgan: Brother-in-law of Brother Rhys and grandfather to Meurig.
- Owain ap Rhys: Brother to Cynfrith, cousin of Brother Rhys.
- Father Radulfus: Introduced to the monks by Heribert as both return from the Legatine Council three days after the Christmas feast, just as Cadfael returns from Rhydycroesau. Based on the real abbot who succeeded Heribert.

== Title ==
The author does make a point of using herbs and medicinal plants of that era, accurately. One book discusses the series from the perspective of the herbs. In an interview in 1993, Peters said she used Culpepper and an untitled book from the 15th century for information on the herbs, and typical medicines. Herbs play a supporting role in most of the novels, but "In Monk’s Hood, of course, that was the poison. I haven’t done much with herbs that have mixed properties—either beneficial or poisonous, depending on their use. I’d like to get back to using herbs more in my plots. I haven’t used them so much in the last few books".

== Background and setting in history ==
Although the characters and events in the novel are invented, Heribert and Radulfus were real abbots of Shrewsbury Abbey, and Radulfus really did replace Heribert in 1138. There really was a legatine conference in Westminster in 1138 led by Alberic of Ostia, a Benedictine monk and cardinal-bishop of Ostia, sent by the Pope to recognise King Stephen and to elect a new archbishop for Canterbury. Prior Robert Pennant is also a real person, who eventually succeeded Radulfus in 1148.

The places named in the story are real, including Shrewsbury Abbey, Shrewsbury Castle, the river Severn that winds around the town and separates the Abbey from the town proper. Oswestry and the nearby village of Rhydycroesau are real. The latter strides the modern border between England and Wales. Llansilin was the town where court was held for the commote of Cynllaith. Croesau Bach (cy) was then in Wales, and is now part of Shropshire (as described in Welsh Wikipedia). Cadfael describes his own home in Wales as "The vale of Conwy is my native place, near by Trefriw."

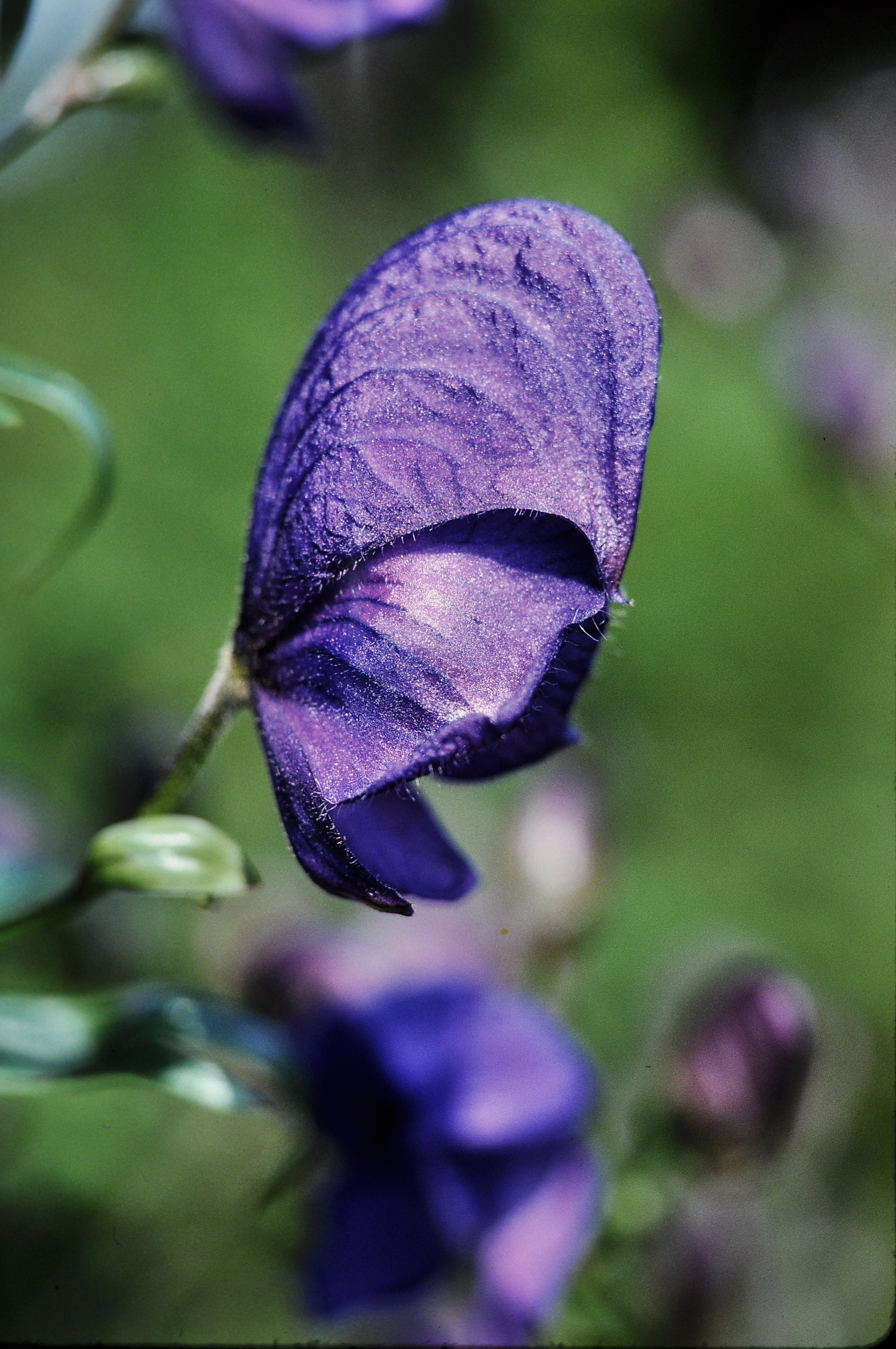
Monkshood flower, Aconitum napellus

The plant monkshood is poisonous in all its parts, with the upper petals in a shape reminiscent of the hood worn by the Benedictine monks.

== Reviews and awards ==
Kirkus Reviews finds it superior entertainment but misses a character from the prior novel.

Mystery author, librarian and medieval historian Dean James finds Ellis to be strong in her ability to draw characters who are distinctly medieval, not modern. Cadfael can be trusted by the reader to "have the wisdom and compassion to do everything within his power to set the disordered situation to rights."

Monk's Hood won an award from the Crime Writers' Association in 1980, the CWA Silver Dagger award.

== Publication history ==
Monk's Hood was first published in the UK by Macmillan in August 1980, ISBN 0333294106 / 9780333294109 (UK edition). The US hardback edition was published in April 1981. Two large print editions were issued in June 1982 and January 1998.

Nine paperback editions were issued in the US and the UK, the first in 1982, and the most recent in April 2010 by Sphere.

Fifteen audio book editions have been issued on cassette and CD. Chivers issued the first in September 1990; the most recent is from ISIS in April 2012.

The novel has been published in French, German, Italian, Dutch, and Portuguese, listed at Goodreads. It was also published in Danish.

- French: Le capuchon du moine (Frère Cadfael, #3), Published 2001 by 10/18, Mass Market Paperback, 287 pages ISBN 2264033363 (9782264033369)
- German: Bruder Cadfael und das Mönchskraut, Ein mittelalterlicher Kriminalroman Published 2002 by Heyne, 254 pages, Eva Malsch (Übersetzerin) ISBN 3453186648 (9783453186644)
- Italian: Il cappuccio del monaco, Paperback, Published 1 January 1992 by Tea, 204 pages ISBN 8878192252 (9788878192256)
- Dutch: Het gemene gewas, Paperback, Published 1995 by De Boekerij, 213 pages, Pieter Janssens (Translator) ISBN 9022508390 (9789022508398)
- Portuguese: Justiça à Moda Antiga [Old Fashioned Justice], Paperback, Published 1984 by Europa-América
- Danish: Stedsønnen fra Mallilie [Stepson from Mallilie], by Ellis Peters, (Translator or narrator) Søren Elung Jensen 2000 Copenhagen Danmarks Blindebibliotek (audiobook, OCLC 473817503)

== Adaptations ==
=== Radio ===
Monk's Hood was the third Cadfael book to be adapted for BBC Radio, in sequence with the publication of the novels. The radio adaptation was written by Bert Coules, and starred Philip Madoc as Brother Cadfael and Geoffrey Whitehead as Prior Robert. It was first broadcast on BBC Radio 4 in 1991, in five parts:

1. Troubled Times
2. The Inheritance
3. Hunted
4. Mallilie
5. Judgement

It has since been re-broadcast on BBC Radio 7, then BBC Radio 4 Extra, and released as an audio book (and reviewed).

=== Television ===
The book was the fourth to be adapted for television by Central and Carlton Media for distribution worldwide, in 1994. It was out of sequence as two later books in the series preceded it on the screen. The "Cadfael" television series eventually extended to thirteen episodes, all of which starred Sir Derek Jacobi as the sleuthing monk. The series was filmed mostly in Hungary.

The television adaptation for Monk's Hood stuck fairly closely to the original novel. Although several Welsh actors appeared, Jacobi retained an educated English accent.
