= Shrewsbury Abbey =

11th-century Benedictine abbey, now church

- Abbey Church of the Holy Cross, Shrewsbury
- Church of the Abbey of Saint Peter and Saint Paul, Shrewsbury
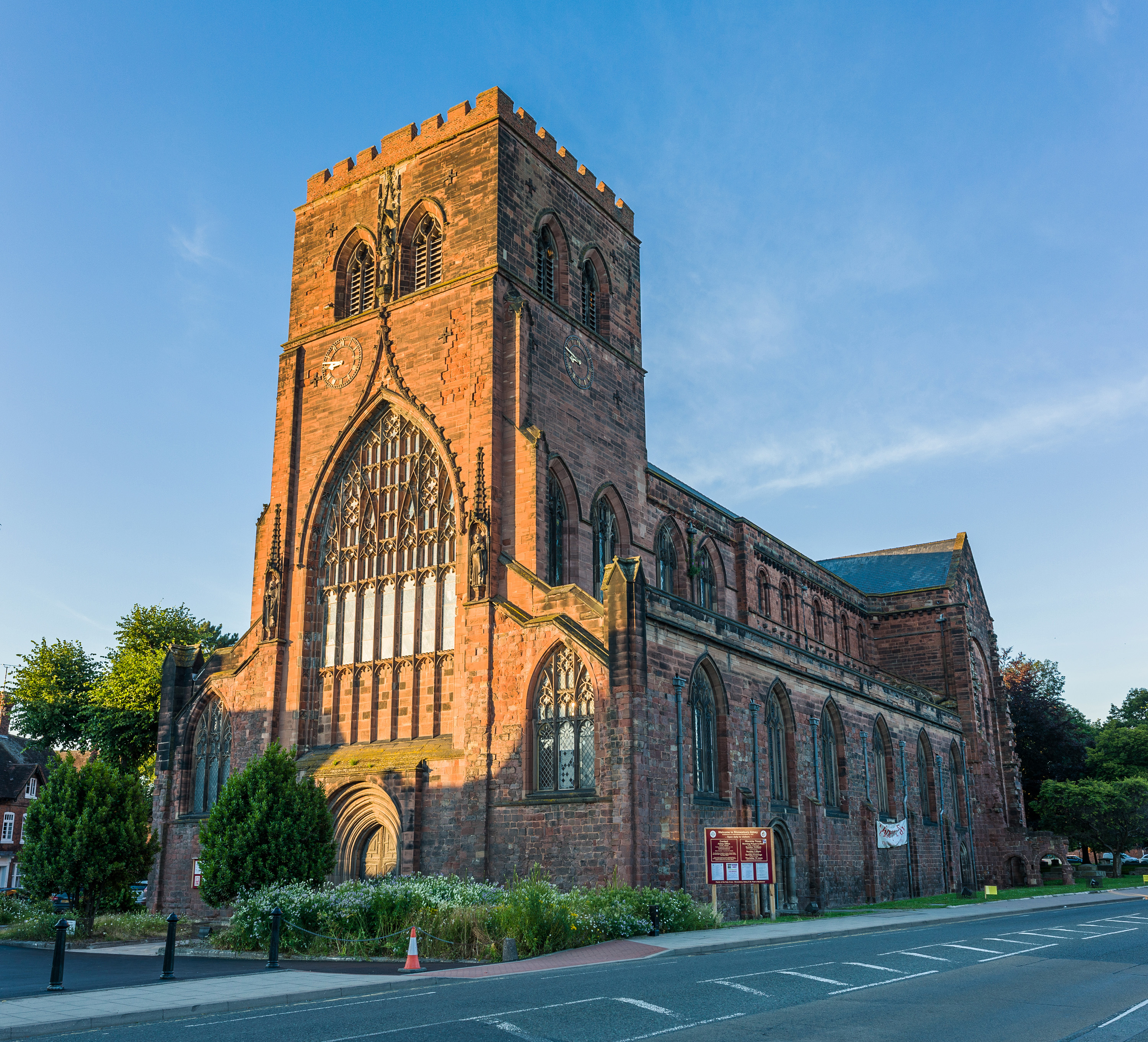
- Shrewsbury Abbey
- 52°42′27″N 2°44′39″W
- OS grid reference: SJ 49844 12474
- Location: Shrewsbury, Shropshire
- Country: England
- Denomination: Church of England
- Churchmanship: Anglo-Catholic with choral tradition
- Website: www.shrewsburyabbey.com

History
- Status: Active
- Founded: 1083
- Dedication: Holy Cross

Architecture
- Functional status: Parish church
- Heritage designation: Scheduled monument, Grade I listed building
- Style: Romanesque, Gothic
- Groundbreaking: 11th century
- Completed: 14th century

Specifications
- Materials: Red sandstone

Administration
- Province: Canterbury
- Diocese: Lichfield
- Parish: Holy Cross, Shrewsbury

Clergy
- Vicar(s): Pat Aldred, associate priest
- Pastor: Organist Nigel Pursey

Scheduled monument
- Official name: Shrewsbury Abbey (Including Pulpit)
- Reference no.: 1003718

Listed Building – Grade I
- Official name: Abbey Church of the Holy Cross
- Designated: 10 January 1953
- Reference no.: 1246392

Shrewsbury Abbey
- Interactive map of Shrewsbury Abbey

Monastery information
- Full name: The Abbey of Saint Peter and Saint Paul
- Order: Benedictine
- Denomination: Catholic Church
- Established: 1083
- Disestablished: 1540
- Dedication: St Peter & St Paul

Architecture
- Status: Dissolved
- Heritage designation: Scheduled monument
- Style: Romanesque, Gothic

The Abbey Church of the Holy Cross (commonly known as Shrewsbury Abbey) is an ancient foundation in Shrewsbury, the county town of Shropshire, England.

The Abbey was founded in 1083 as a Benedictine monastery by the Norman Earl of Shrewsbury, Roger de Montgomery. It grew to be one of the most important and influential abbeys in England, and an important centre of pilgrimage. Although much of the Abbey was destroyed in the 16th century, the nave survived as a parish church, and today serves as the mother church for the Parish of Holy Cross.

The Abbey is a Grade I listed building and is a member of the Greater Churches Group. It is located to the east of Shrewsbury town centre, near the English Bridge, and is surrounded by a triangular area which is today referred to as Abbey Foregate.

== History ==
=== Foundation ===
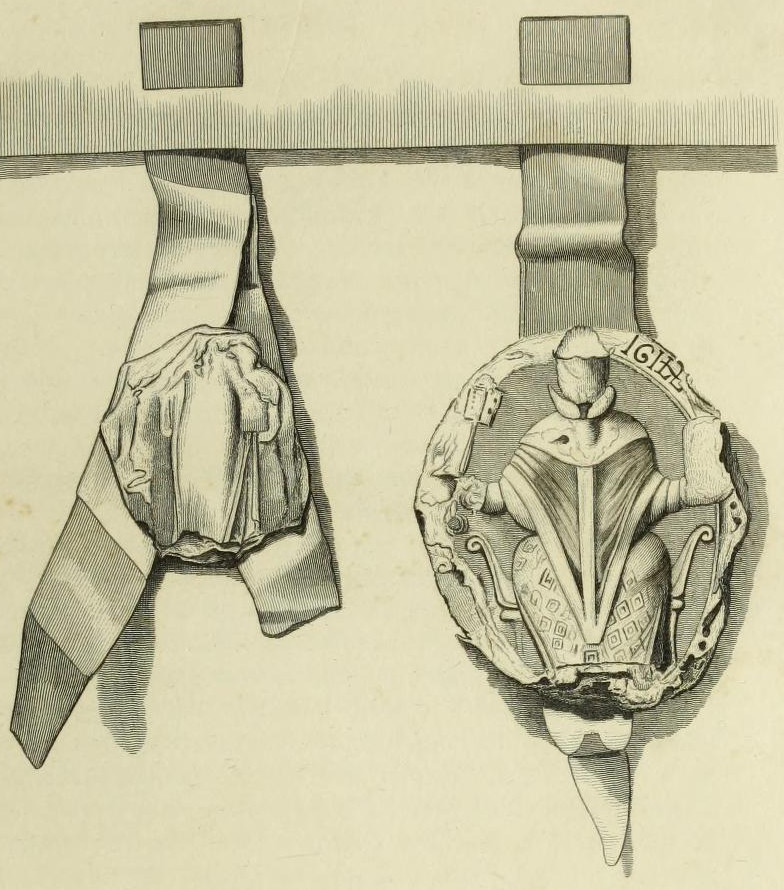
Seal of Shrewsbury Abbey with fragment of abbot's seal, c. 1200, showing St Peter enthroned and bearing the Keys of Heaven and a book. It was used to validate a deed from the time of Abbot Hugh de Lacy.

Before the Norman Conquest of England, a small Saxon chapel dedicated to St Peter stood outside the east gate of Shrewsbury; it had been built by Siward, son of Ethelgar and a close relative of Edward the Confessor. There was still a landowner, known as Siward the Fat, in Shropshire in the Domesday Book of 1086, although he had owned many more estates in 1066. He must have been the donor of the two estates the church is known from Domesday to have held in 1066: at Boreton near Condover and Lowe near Farley. However, the Abbey had lost Lowe by 1087.

When Roger de Montgomery received Shropshire from William the Conqueror in 1071, he gave the church to one of his clerks, Odelerius of Orléans, the father of the historian Orderic Vitalis, who is the main source for the foundation of the Abbey and probably an eye-witness. Orderic stresses his father's role in persuading Earl Roger to commit himself to building a monastery and stresses that Odelerius from the outset wanted it to be Benedictine. The specific purpose was to benefit Earl Roger's soul.

Unde generositatem vestram, gloriose consul, fideliter admoneo ut, dum licet, in comitatu vestro (quem jure a patribus non consecutus es haereditario) monachile castrum contra Satanan construatur Deo; ubi pro anima vesita cucullati pugiles Behemoth conflictu resistent assiduo.

Translation:

I therefore offer to you, most noble earl, my faithful advice, that while it is in your power, you call a stronghold for monks against Satan to be built for the service of God in the chief seat of your earldom, which is not yours by inheritance from your ancestors, in order that these cowled combatants may withstand the devil in continual conflict for the good of your soul.

On 25 February 1083 Earl Roger summoned his senior officials, including Warin, the Sheriff of Shropshire and Picot de Say, and publicly pledged himself to found a new Abbey, laying his gloves on the altar of St. Peter and granting the whole suburb outside the east gate for the construction. Reginald and Frodo, two monks from the great Benedictine Abbey of Saint-Martin-de-Séez in Southern Normandy, formed the nucleus of the new community, and began to plan and build the monks' lodging, working with Odelerius and Warin. The Domesday Book found the abbey under construction: "In the City of SHREWSBURY Earl Roger is building an Abbey and has given to it the monastery of St Peter where the parish (church?) of the City was." This suggests that Siward's foundation was already a monastery before Earl Roger began building but it is fairly certain there was no more than a wooden parish church.

When sufficiently complete (probably late in 1087), regular life began under the first abbot, Fulchred of Sées. The Abbey of Saint-Martin-de-Sées was closely associated with Shrewsbury in the early years because Earl Roger was its founder and he and the House of Bellême, into which he had married, were also major benefactors there, as were Roger's knights. A notification lodged at Sées in 1086 by Robert of Bellême, Roger's son, who was later to become 3rd Earl of Shrewsbury, shows that they used the monks as witnesses in their property deals and custodians of the documents. About the time he recruited Abbot Fulchred or Foucher, Earl Roger made a huge grant of estates in England to Sées, for the soul of recently deceased William the Conqueror, as well as of Queen Matilda and of Roger himself and his dead wife Mabel de Bellême. Some of these were estates he had originally intended for Mabel. It seems that Sées Abbey for a time harboured plans to claim jurisdiction over Shrewsbury and it also contested some properties granted by Earl Roger; however, Shrewsbury became independent.

Once it was safely under the leadership of Fulchred, Odelerius placed Benedict, one of his sons, in Shrewsbury Abbey as an oblate, with a gift of 200 silver livres. Both Odelerius himself and Earl Roger met their deaths as monks of the Abbey.

=== Difficulties and insecurity ===
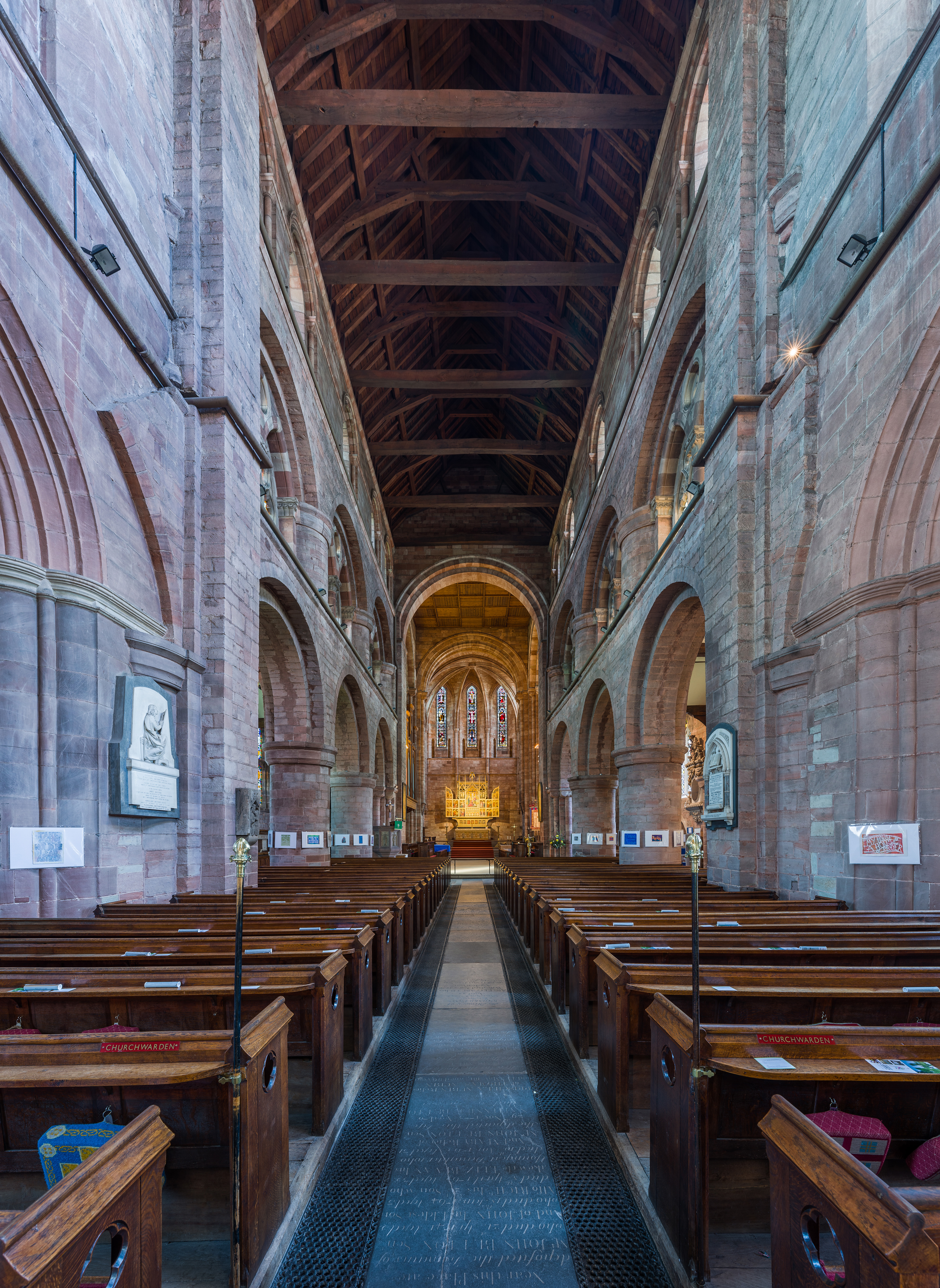
Shrewsbury Abbey interior

Earl Roger and his associates added several estates and other sources of income to Shrewsbury Abbey's endowment, which had been valued at £46 18s. in 1086, before the first abbot was appointed. As well as rural manors, the abbey had urban property, mills, and the tithes and advowsons of many churches. However, Orderic, a shrewd observer, tells us that Roger only "moderately endowed with lands and rents" (terris ac redditibus mediocriter locupletavit). Moreover, there was a long wait ahead before some of the endowments were to materialise.

The abbey's modest but sufficient wealth was threatened, before many of the grants were confirmed by royal charter, when Earl Roger's son, Robert of Bellême, revolted against Henry I in 1102. The king exiled and expropriated his unruly vassal and the patronage of the abbey escheated to the Crown. This deprived the abbey of powerful local protection and gave the descendants and successors of donors an opportunity to wriggle out of their obligations. For example, Siward had given up any claims he might have to the abbey site in return for a life-time grant from Earl Roger of the estate of Langafeld, now Cheney Longville, which would pass to the abbey on his death. Siward's son, Aldred, refused to surrender the estate to the abbey until Abbot Fulchred gave him £15. This arrangement was engineered by Richard de Belmeis I, later Bishop of London, whom the king had sent to exercise viceregal powers in Shropshire after Earl Robert's expropriation. However, Richard was not to be trusted. On his death bed in 1127 he admitted to his confessors that he had lied about his tenure of Betton in Berrington, which really belonged to Shrewsbury Abbey – probably a grant from Robert de Limesey, then Bishop of Chester His confessor tried to clear up the matter by stating the facts to the interested parties. Although Richard had directed that the estate be restored to Shrewsbury Abbey, its status was contested by his lay successors for decades. In 1127 Philip de Belmeis sued for the estate, although he quickly defaulted. His younger son, Ranulph, tried again a few decades later, but gave up in return for acceptance into the abbey's lay fraternity. As late as 1212 Roger de la Zouche launched a fresh suit, in which he persisted for years, unsuccessfully. These were only examples of a morass of complex litigation into which the abbey was drawn.

However, Henry I himself seems to have been supportive of Shrewsbury Abbey, especially when in the vicinity. He confirmed Robert's gift of land Baschurch to Fulchred, perhaps while actually campaigning against Robert in Shropshire and Staffordshire. He also took Fulchred's side in a variety of disputes with officials of the royal forests in Shropshire and reminded local officials and barons that the abbey was exempt from all customs, as in the time of Earl Roger.

After this initial support, however, there was a long delay before the king took further action on the monastery's behalf. It is unclear when Abbot Fulchred died, but it was certainly some years before 1121, when Henry at last came to the support of Godfrey, the second abbot, with a series of charters. Some of these, at least, were issued within Shropshire: at Bridgnorth, Condover and Shrewsbury itself. These included a general statement of principle that the new abbot was to enjoy the same estates and privileges as his predecessor. Note was taken that the abbey had exchanged Henry de Say's manor of Brompton, south of Shrewsbury, for Siward's former estate of Cheney Longville in an attempt to improve management and economise by concentrating resources. Two documents announced and confirmed Henry's own valuable gift of multure or mill-right to the abbey within Shrewsbury. As the monks were to receive the miller's fee for all grain ground in the town, they had a monopoly over milling, and no-one else was allowed to grind corn without their permission. As it was related to the water power of the Severn and its tributaries, the king attached to the grant a monopoly over fisheries at both of the town's bridges. The newly appointed Bishop of Hereford, the ambitious royal administrator Richard de Capella, whose diocese included a large part of southern Shropshire, was specifically warned not to let the king hear of any complaints against himself in relation to the Abbey.

=== Robert of Shrewsbury and the translation of St Winifred ===
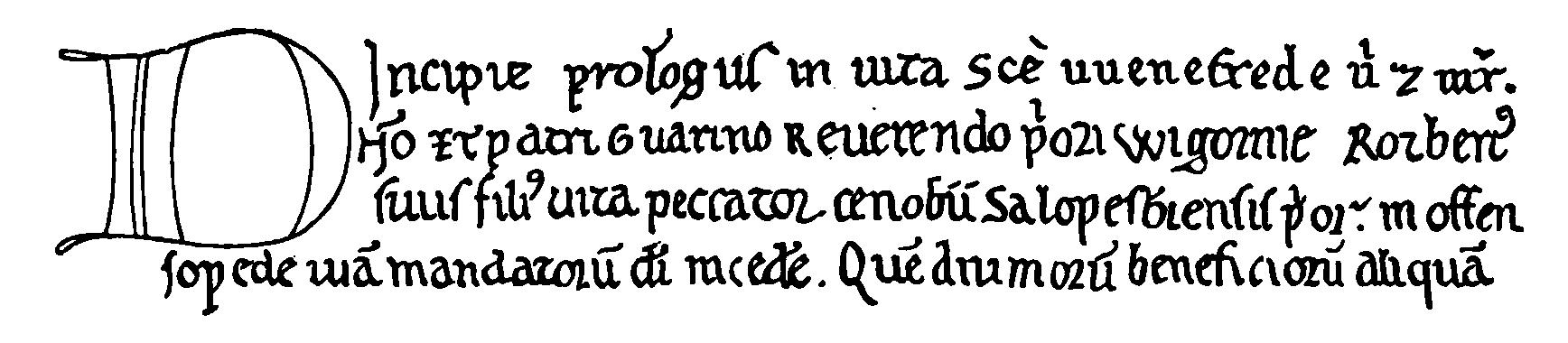
Part of the prologue of a life of St Winifred by Robert of Shrewsbury, Bodleian Mss. Laud c.94.

In 1137/38 Robert of Shrewsbury, who was prior under the third and fourth abbots, Herbert and Ralph, negotiated and carried out the translation of the remains of St Winifred from Gwytherin in Wales. Robert is thought to have been a member of the Pennant family of Downing, a few miles north-west of Holywell, the main shrine and fountain of Saint Winifred. He wrote a life of the saint shortly after the translation, adding an account of his mission to Wales, which is the main source of information about the events. The body was disinterred and borne ceremoniously to Shrewsbury, a week's journey on foot and thus encumbered. There it was laid in the church of St Giles to await the blessing of the Bishop of Coventry and Lichfield. Overnight a youth was enabled to walk again by the presence of the reliquary. It was taken in procession into the town. The expectation of an episcopal blessing ensured it was witnessed by "an incredible concourse of devout people" as it was taken to be placed on the altar of the Abbey church, where further miracles were reported. The relics were later enshrined in the abbey.

Robert is generally accepted as responsible for strengthening the cult of Winifred, who had hitherto been an obscure Welsh saint, so that she became the focus of pilgrimages from Shrewsbury and other centres from the 14th century to the present. Later he became the fifth abbot and, although little is known of his abbacy, he seems to have been zealous in pursuing the abbey's interests against local rivals. He was successful in recovering two portions of the tithes of Emstrey parish church which had been granted "against conscience and the consent of his convent" by Abbot Ralph to the church at Atcham. Emstrey was a large parish, which stretched from the western bank of the River Severn opposite Atcham to the Abbey Foregate. The Abbey cartulary contains an instrument by which the Archbishop, Theobald of Bec, orders Bishop Walter to restore the tithes to the abbey. The underlying rivalry was not between the Shrewsbury Abbey and the little church of St Eata, but between the Shrewsbury and its Augustinian rival, Lilleshall Abbey which was tightening its grip on Atcham manor and parish, apparently to expand it across the Severn. Its ownership of the ferry crossing at Atcham was an important source of income for Lilleshall. It had recently acquired the advowson of Atcham church, and was later allowed to appropriate the church by Thomas Becket. By the beginning of the Plantagenet era Shrewsbury Abbey faced considerable competition for resources from major monasteries in the vicinity. As well as Lilleshall, technically a royal foundation, but effectively the creation of the brothers Philip and Richard de Belmeis II, there was Haughmond Abbey, another large Augustinian house closely connected with the FitzAlan family, and Buildwas Abbey, a large Cistercian house that received gifts from many of the local nobility, including the Belmeis and FitzAlans.

The quest for relics seems to have played an important part in the abbey's effort to maintain itself in the face of such competition. Abbot Adam, Robert's successor, is known to have visited Canterbury, probably with this aim, and it was probably he who brought back an entire rochet that had belonged to Becket, part of another which was stained with the blood of his martyrdom, another cloth stained with his blood and brains, and various items of his clothing, including his hair shirt, collar, girdle, cowl, shirt and glove. A document prepared in the reign of Henry II lists these relics along with those of many other saints. Second only to the relics of Winifred were those of St Elerius, St Winifred's spiritual director, then wrongly considered the author of a life of Winifred that is now thought to date from about 1100.

=== Monastic life and management ===
The Benedictine Rule was not austere in comparison with the discipline of the Cistercians and Augustinians, and Shrewsbury Abbey was markedly less isolated than its competitors, located as it was in the suburbs of a major town. Because of good management, the abbey did not get into serious difficulties in the 12th century, despite the underlying problems with many of its endowments. Even in the early 12th century the abbey owned a number of properties in and around the town: orchards, a vineyard and a sand-pit. In the 13th century the integration with Shrewsbury became closer still, as the abbey expanded its holdings of urban property in the Abbey Foregate, the market, and elsewhere in the town. The great majority of the rural holdings were let to small farmers or cultivated as demesne lands; only rarely did the community let entire manors to laymen, and it was reluctant to tolerate leases of more than one lifetime. The demesnes were managed by lay bailiffs and stewards on behalf of the abbey; there is no evidence that the monks themselves ever cultivated the land.

Within the bounds of this fairly comfortable provision, monastic discipline was apparently quite good. In 1323-4 Bishop Roger Northburgh, recently appointed and at war with much of the ecclesiastical establishment in his diocese, instigated a series of canonical visitations that took in all of the abbeys and smaller houses around Shrewsbury. While criticisms were, in many cases, severe, Shrewsbury's shortcomings were fairly minor or very general: too many monks were missing meals in the refectory, novices were allowed out before they had properly learnt the Rule, and the accounts of the obedientiaries, the abbot's under-managers, were inadequate – this last a complaint made of nearly all religious houses in the diocese. Thirty years later, in the wake of the Black Death, Northburgh found buildings on many manors were in poor repair, but this was a sign of the times, not the fault of the monks.

In the later Middle Ages the number of monks ranged from 12 to 18. Generally one was away, heading Morville Priory, a dependent monastic cell between Bridgnorth and Much Wenlock. In addition to the canonical hours there was regular celebration of Mass in the growing number of chantries and other chapels. The chapel of St Mary, behind the High Altar, contained the tomb of Earl Roger and was endowed well from the early 13th century. A monk was appointed as its warden and it was initially used to celebrate Mass for visiting dignitaries. In 1343-4 a chantry was established there for the soul of Ralph of Shrewsbury, the Bishop of Bath and Wells, funded from the revenues of Boreton. Another chantry was endowed for John Burley in 1414, and shortly afterwards Henry V decided to establish a chantry in honour of St Winifred but, this had to wait until much later.

The abbey made some effort to develop its monks intellectually, as well as spiritually. In 1333, on the request of Edward III and Queen Philippa, the Pope allowed it to take over the tithes of Wrockwardine parish church and devote them to the education in theology of two monks at a university, although the quota was later reduced to a single monk.

=== Abbots ===
The monarch was patron of the abbey, but there is no record of whether 12th-century monarchs actually played any part in the installation of Shrewsbury's abbots. Confusion has surrounded the election of Herbert, the third abbot. Orderic wrote that: Herbertus gubernaculum rudis abbatiae usurpavit. This has been translated to as stating that Herbert "usurped the rudder of the infant establishment" or that he simply "took the government of this rising community." He was consecrated by Archbishop William de Corbeil but later removed by a legatine council and replaced by Ralph or Ranulf. In 1250, during the reign of Henry III, there was a major dispute over the succession in which the local candidate, the sacrist Adam, was rejected by the bishop, who appointed William the sub-prior of Coventry. Both were set aside by the Pope, who provided instead Henry, a monk from Evesham Abbey. A month after his appointment Henry was also granted the privilege of wearing the pontifical ring. The king had played no independent part in the drama: nevertheless the Benedictine chronicler of Tewkesbury Abbey accused him of intruding William into Shrewsbury Abbey. Thereafter, abbots were invariably elected from within the monastic community.

The abbots became increasingly important political figures. Since the confiscation of Earl Robert's lands by the Crown, each Abbot of Shrewsbury was a tenant-in-chief, and with the summoning of Parliament in the reign of Henry III, compelled to attend. Abbot Luke bought a house in London to make it easier for himself and his successors to attend Parliament and perform other important political business. This was a good buy, as when the number of abbots summoned to parliament was fixed at 28 during the reign of Edward III, the Abbot of Shrewsbury was one of them. The Victoria County History asserts that the abbots were permitted by the Pope to wear the mitre from 1397. Abbot Richard Lye actually died in London while on parliamentary business in 1512 and was buried at St Bartholomew-the-Less in Smithfield.

==== List of Abbots ====
1. Fulchred, c. 1087-x 1119
2. Godfrey, x 1121-1128
3. Heribert, 1128–1138
4. Ranulf, x 1138-1147 x
5. Robert, occurs 1150 × 1159-1168
6. Adam, 1168 × 1173-1175
7. Ralph, elected 1175-1186 × 1190
8. Hugh de Lacy, fl. 1190 x 1220
9. Walter, 1221–1223
10. Henry, 1223–1244
11. Adam, 1244–1250
12. William, 1250–1251
13. Henry, 1251–1258
14. Thomas, 1259–1266
15. William of Upton, 1266–1271
16. Luke of Wenlock, 1272–1279
17. John of Drayton, 1279–1292
18. William of Muckley, 1292–1333
19. Adam of Cleobury, 1333–1355
20. Henry de Alston, 1355–1361
21. Nicholas Stevens, 1361–1399
22. Thomas Prestbury, 1399–1426
23. John Hampton, 1426–1433
24. Thomas Ludlow, 1433–1459
25. Thomas Mynde, 1460–1498
26. Richard Lye, 1498–1512
27. Richard Baker, 1512–1528
28. Thomas Boteler 1529–1540

=== Endowments ===
The abbey's lands and other income sources were found all over Shropshire, although sparse in the south-west, where Earl Roger had less power and influence. As well as landed estates, there were a number of lucrative churches, salt pans and fisheries. After the first spate of donations there was a tendency for endowments to become more scattered, with grants in Lancashire, Staffordshire, Cheshire and even Cambridgeshire. It was impossible to dispose legally of mortmain properties, as they were inherently inalienable: Church property could be lost only if there was doubt about its status. Billingsley was given up to Sées Abbey in exchange for recognition of Shrewsbury's rights in Lancashire. Part of Betton was surrendered to Hamo Lestrange, and is still known as Betton Strange. In 1286 Edward I ordered the surrender of lands at Mere in Staffordshire, a royal grant to the abbey, which Abbot Drayton had given away to William de Merton.

==== List of endowments ====
Endowments
Location	Donor or original owner	Nature of property	Approximate coordinates
Abbey Foregate and Monkmoor	Earl Roger	Land surrounding abbey site	52°40′00″N 2°40′17″W
Charlton, Wrockwardine	Odelerius	1 hide of land	52°41′51″N 2°35′56″W
Boreton	Originally donated by Siward, restored by Earl Roger.	1 hide of land	52°39′17″N 2°43′21″W
Morville	Earl Roger	Church of St Gregory and 5 hides of land	52°32′31″N 2°29′19″W
Baschurch	Earl Roger	Church and 2 1/2 hides of land	52°47′29″N 2°51′29″W
Great Ness	Earl Roger	St Andrew's Church and 1 virgate of land	52°45′56″N 2°53′39″W
Stottesdon	Earl Roger	St Mary's Church and 2 1/2 hides of land	52°26′35″N 2°29′00″W
Emstrey	Earl Roger	Entire manor, 9 hides of land.	52°41′20″N 2°42′04″W
Corfham	Earl Roger	Church with 1 hide of land.	52°27′38″N 2°42′00″W
Tugford	Reginald, the Sheriff	3 1/2 hides of land.	52°28′48″N 2°39′16″W
Shrewsbury	Earl Roger	Urban houses and mills.	52°42′30″N 2°45′16″W
Eyton on Severn	Earl Roger	2 1/2 hides of land.	52°39′07″N 2°37′55″W
Wrockwardine	Earl Roger	Church and 1 hide of land.	52°42′17″N 2°33′25″W
Berrington	Warin the Sheriff	Church	52°39′27″N 2°41′44″W
Diddlebury	Earl Roger but later challenged by Sées Abbey and surrendered to chapter of Hereford Cathedral	Church	52°27′51″N 2°43′30″W
Hodnet	Earl Roger	St Luke's Church	52°51′13″N 2°34′37″W
Betton in Hales	Gerard de Tournai	Manor	52°55′38″N 2°27′37″W
Betton in Berrington	Robert de Limesey	Manor	52°40′01″N 2°43′09″W
Condover	Earl Roger	St Andrew's Church	52°38′51″N 2°44′54″W
Donington	Earl Roger	St Cuthbert's Church	52°38′21″N 2°17′02″W
Edgmond	Earl Roger	St Peter's Church	52°46′14″N 2°24′58″W
High Ercall	Earl Roger	St Michael's Church	52°45′08″N 2°36′08″W
Tong	Earl Roger	St. Bartholomew's Church	52°39′50″N 2°18′13″W
Wellington	Earl Roger	Church	52°42′07″N 2°31′04″W
Myddle	Warin the Sheriff, confirmed by Hugh Fitz-Warin, his son, and Reginald or Rainald, his successor.	Church	52°48′27″N 2°47′28″W
Oswestry	Warin the Sheriff, confirmed by Rainald and Hugh.	Church	52°51′26″N 3°03′28″W
Albrighton, also known as Monks' Albrighton	Probably given by Alcher who held it from Reginald or Rainald at Domesday, but later confirmed by Earl Roger.	Manor	52°45′27″N 2°44′46″W
Hordley	Held at Domesday by Odo of Bernières, whose donation was confirmed by Earl Roger.	Manor	52°52′16″N 2°55′19″W
Thelwall	Roger the Poitevin, son of Earl Roger.	Fishery	53°22′57″N 2°31′51″W
Poulton-le-Fylde, Lancashire	Roger the Poitevin.	Township	53°50′49″N 2°59′42″W
Woolston, Lancashire,	Godefrid	Church	53°24′44″N 3°02′51″W
Kirkham, Lancashire	Godefrid	St Michael's Church, Kirkham	53°47′03″N 2°52′16″W
Brompton, near Berrington	Henry de Say in exchange for Cheney Longville.	Manor. Tithes granted earlier by Picot de Say.	52°40′00″N 2°40′17″W
Crudgington	Hamo Peverel	Township	52°45′32″N 2°32′56″W
Sleap	Hamo Peverel	Township	52°49′53″N 2°45′34″W
Kynnersley	Sybilla, wife of Hamo	Township	52°44′49″N 2°29′02″W
Loughton, Shropshire	Robert Corbet	Township	52°26′38″N 2°34′01″W
Pimley	Fulk the Sheriff	Manor	52°43′28″N 2°42′37″W
Aston, Shropshire	Empress Matilda	Manor	52°40′59″N 2°34′26″W
Isleham, Cambridgeshire	William FitzAlan, Lord of Oswestry	Lands	52°20′35″N 0°24′33″E
Tadlow, Cambridgeshire	Fulk FitzWarin in exchange for the abbey giving up disputed claims to Alberbury church.	Lands	52°07′N 0°08′W
Nantwich, Cheshire	William Malbank	Salt pan	53°04′01″N 2°31′19″W

=== Late Middle Ages: crises, opportunities and felonies ===
The economic crisis of the early 14th century hit monasteries hard and Shrewsbury was no exception. One response was to evade the risks of demesne farming in favour of the secure income stream from leases: the Shropshire demesnes seem to have been contracted from 21 carucates in 1291 to 12 in 1355. There were other consolidations. Abbot Adam of Cleobury in 1344 traded the abbey's right to cut timber in the king's woods across the county, which was often hard to exploit because of poor communications, for 240 acres of nearby Lythwood, although the exchange cost £100 at the time and an annual rent of £3. The Black Death brought a much worse crisis. Repeated outbreaks of the plague reduced the labour force so that in 1354 Bishop Northburgh blamed the scarcity of labour for the disrepair of many buildings, although he warned the abbey to look after its investment in Lythwood. The next abbot, Henry of Alston, died after a short period of office and soon there were not even enough priests. In 1365 Abbot Nicholas Stevens and the prior of Coventry were each granted a faculty by the Pope to ordain ten to make up the numbers. Stevens seems to have been a fairly effective leader in consolidating the abbey's position.

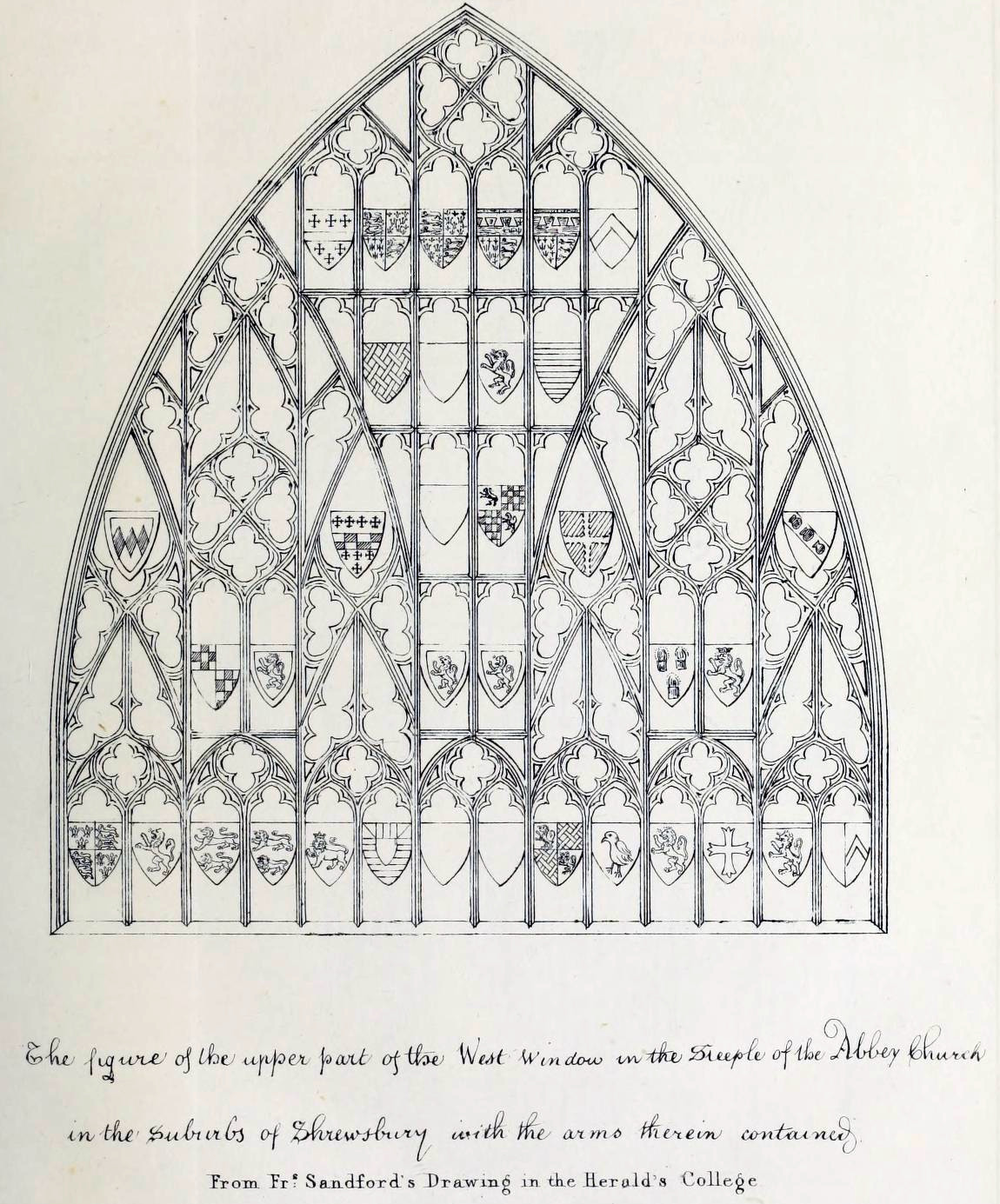
Sketch of West Window, Shrewsbury Abbey, 1658, by Francis Sandford

During the 14th century considerable rebuilding took place at the west end of the Abbey. A sketch of the great west window made in 1658 by Francis Sandford shows a selection of coats of arms that seem to suggest it was glazed around 1388, in the time of Stevens, who may also have been responsible for some of the other 14th century alterations. He was on good terms with the king, Richard II, who attributed his grant of a charter in 1389 not only to his own devotion to St Winifred, but also "the sincere affection we bear and have to Nicholas the abbot, and for his merits."

This may help account for the abbey's relative impunity under Stevens, who sought, through a protracted series of manoeuvres, to annex Sandwell Priory, near West Bromwich in Staffordshire, to Shrewsbury Abbey. In so doing he got away with near-murder. Initially he encouraged one Richard Tudenham to contest the position of the elected prior, John de Kyngeston. In 1370 Kyngeston took legal action against Stevens after suffering an arrow wound in the arm during an attack by five men. In 1379 Stevens, together with two monks and a secular cleric, abducted Kyngeston and held him at a house in Sleap, north of Shrewsbury, until he signed a resignation. Bishop Robert de Stretton installed as prior of Sandwell one of the Shrewsbury monks involved in the abduction, Brother Richard Westbury. However, the conspirators fell out over the spoils, with Tudenham challenging Westbury's appointment. On Westbury's death in 1397, a successor installed by Bishop Richard le Scrope was driven out by an armed gang. Stevens seems largely to have escaped censure for his role in the affair. There can be little doubt, however, of his determination to protect and extend the interests of his abbey. It was apparently under Stevens that a party of Shrewsbury monks stole the relics of St Beuno, St Winifred's uncle and confessor, from Rhewl and installed them in the abbey church. Although the abbey was fined, it was allowed to keep the relics. It was also under Stevens that a new shrine was built for St Winifred herself.

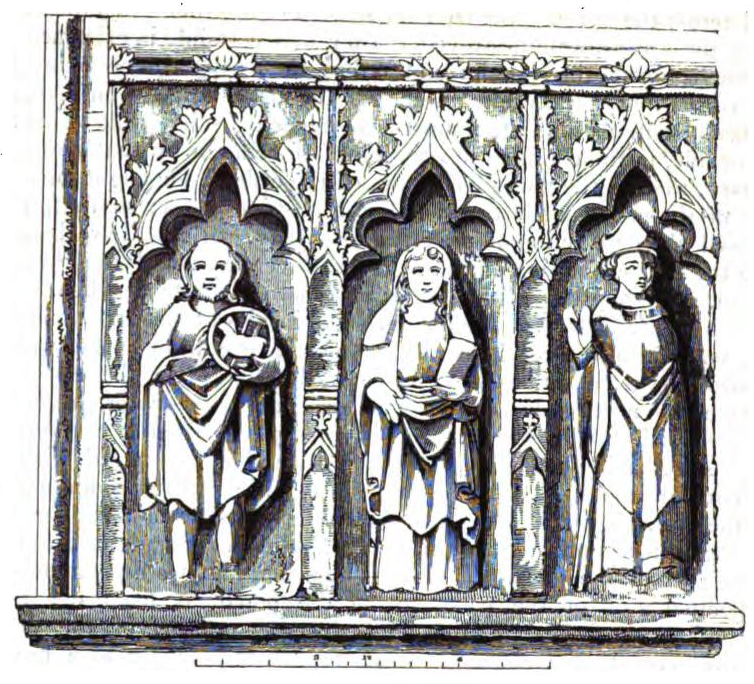
Carved stone, thought to have come from Shrewsbury Abbey. St Winifred is flanked on her right by John the Baptist, with a mitred abbot between them. On her left is Beuno, her uncle, who is said to have raised her from the dead after she was decapitated by a jealous chieftain at Holywell.

Thomas Prestbury clearly had very different relations with Richard II and was committed to the custody of the Abbot of Westminster in April 1399. He was elected Abbot of Shrewsbury in August, after the king had been imprisoned by Henry IV, which suggests he was suspected of Lancastrian sympathies. His efforts to mediate before the Battle of Shrewsbury in 1403 were in vain but he brought great prestige to the abbey as Chancellor of Oxford University. However, even he seems to have lived under the cloud of an accusation of felony.

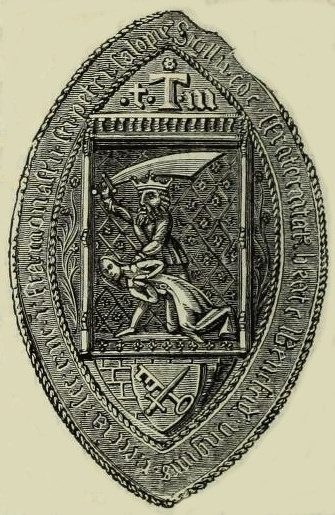
Seal of the fraternity of St Winifred, Shrewsbury Abbey, showing the decapitation of the saint

The veneration of Winifred and the associated cults of Beuno and Elerius seems to have been of increasing importance throughout this period. It was in the time of Stevens or Prestbury that John Mirk, Prior of Lilleshall, composed his sermon for St Winifred's day, part of his much-copied and later printed Festial. The chronicler Adam of Usk, after recording the death and burial of Owain Glyndŵr, noted that: "The king, with great reverence, went on foot in pilgrimage from Shrewsbury to St Winifred's well in North Wales." This journey is not recorded elsewhere but seems to have been in about 1416, and was probably the occasion of Henry V's proposal to install a chantry in honour of the saint at Shrewsbury. Nothing further was done until 1463, when Abbot Thomas Mynde was allowed by the Pope, in response to a letter from his predecessor Abbot Ludlow, to earmark the tithes of Great Ness for the project, with the proviso that enough remain to support a vicar in the parish. By the time the permission arrived, the Yorkists were dominant and it was not until 1487 that Mynde was able to mobilise resources for the purpose. In line with the late medieval trend towards mobilising lay initiative for such work, he set up a guild of men and women to service the chantry. Two years earlier Margaret Beaufort, Henry VII's mother, had rebuilt the shrine at Holywell; William Caxton had printed a translation of Robert of Shrewsbury's life of Winifred. Despite this late flowering of piety and pilgrimage, however, the abbey was entering on difficult times.

=== Decline and dissolution ===
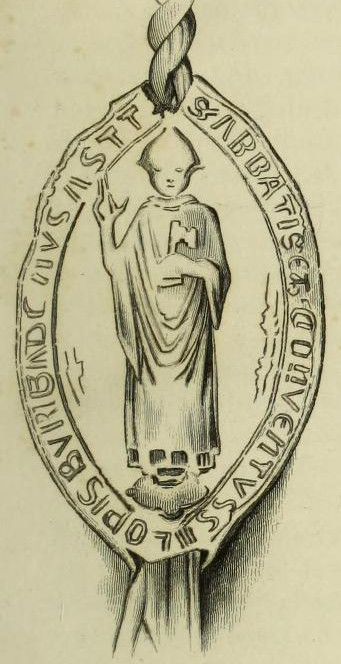
Seal of Shrewsbury Abbey, 1539

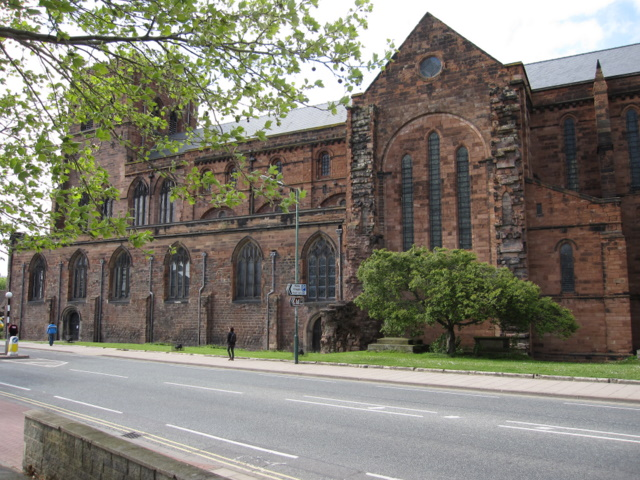
The original north and south transepts were demolished in 1540. The brickwork shows where they would have extended out from the body of the church.

Evidence from the reign of King Henry VIII seems to show the abbey suffering from neglect and maladministration in its later years. Abbot Richard Lye lavished the resources of the monastery on his own family. On 25 October 1508 he granted to his sister Joan and her husband, John Copeland, a large weekly ration of bread and ale, twelve wagonloads of wood annually from Lythwood, and tithes of corn and hay from the townships of Prescott and Stanwardine in the Wood in Baschurch parish. They also received property: a dwelling house and a shop in Shrewsbury, and meadowland and another home in Colneham. It seems that this generosity with others' property had gone on for some time, as they were also given the reversion of further meadowland then occupied by Joan and the abbot's father, Lodovic Lye. The gifts were limited to Joan's lifetime, apart from the shop and houses, which were to pass to her husband for his lifetime if he survived her. Episcopal visitations from the time of Abbot Richard Baker complain of unpaid debts, poor accounting, buildings in decay and land leased without consulting the chapter. This apparently refers to the grants to Joan and John Copeland, which had been made nominally on behalf of abbot and convent together. The infirmary was in ruins and Thomas Butler, the subprior, had taken its glass for his own chamber.

Initially prompted by a dispute over the annulment of the marriage of Henry VIII to Catherine of Aragon, the Church of England separated from the Roman Catholic Church in 1534, and became the established church by an Act of Parliament in the Act of Supremacy, beginning a series of events known as the English Reformation. In the same year there was a Visitation of the Monasteries, ostensibly to examine their character, but in fact to value their assets with a view to expropriation. The Valor Ecclesiasticus of 1535, however, was an entirely candid valuation of the income of the monasteries. The Crown was undergoing financial difficulties, and the wealth of the church, allied to its political weakness, made appropriation of church property both tempting and feasible. Shrewsbury Abbey's income was assessed by the Valor at precisely £527 15s. 5 3/4d. Of this, £414 1s. 3 1/4d. was contributed by the temporalities; essentially, property rents drawn from estates in 26 manors of Shropshire and seven in other counties.

Thomas Cromwell began the Dissolution of the Monasteries in 1536, with the Dissolution of the Lesser Monasteries Act affecting the smaller houses valued at less than £200 a year. This released a torrent of criticism of the larger monasteries that, like Shrewsbury, were comfortably above the threshold. The governance of Thomas Butler, now abbot, was subjected to a litany of complaint to the government by Thomas Maddockes, a London merchant tailor. Much was familiar: the infirmary was no more, numerous parts of the building were in disrepair, and accounting was slack. However, there were instances too of funds being misdirected: the Wrockwardine tithes were no longer funding studies at Oxford, and those of Great Ness did not find their way to Henry V's chantry. Even income intended to buy books for the choir was misappropriated. Boteler was criticised personally for high-handedness and factionalism. More generally, Madockes alleged that the word of God was never preached there since he was abbot."

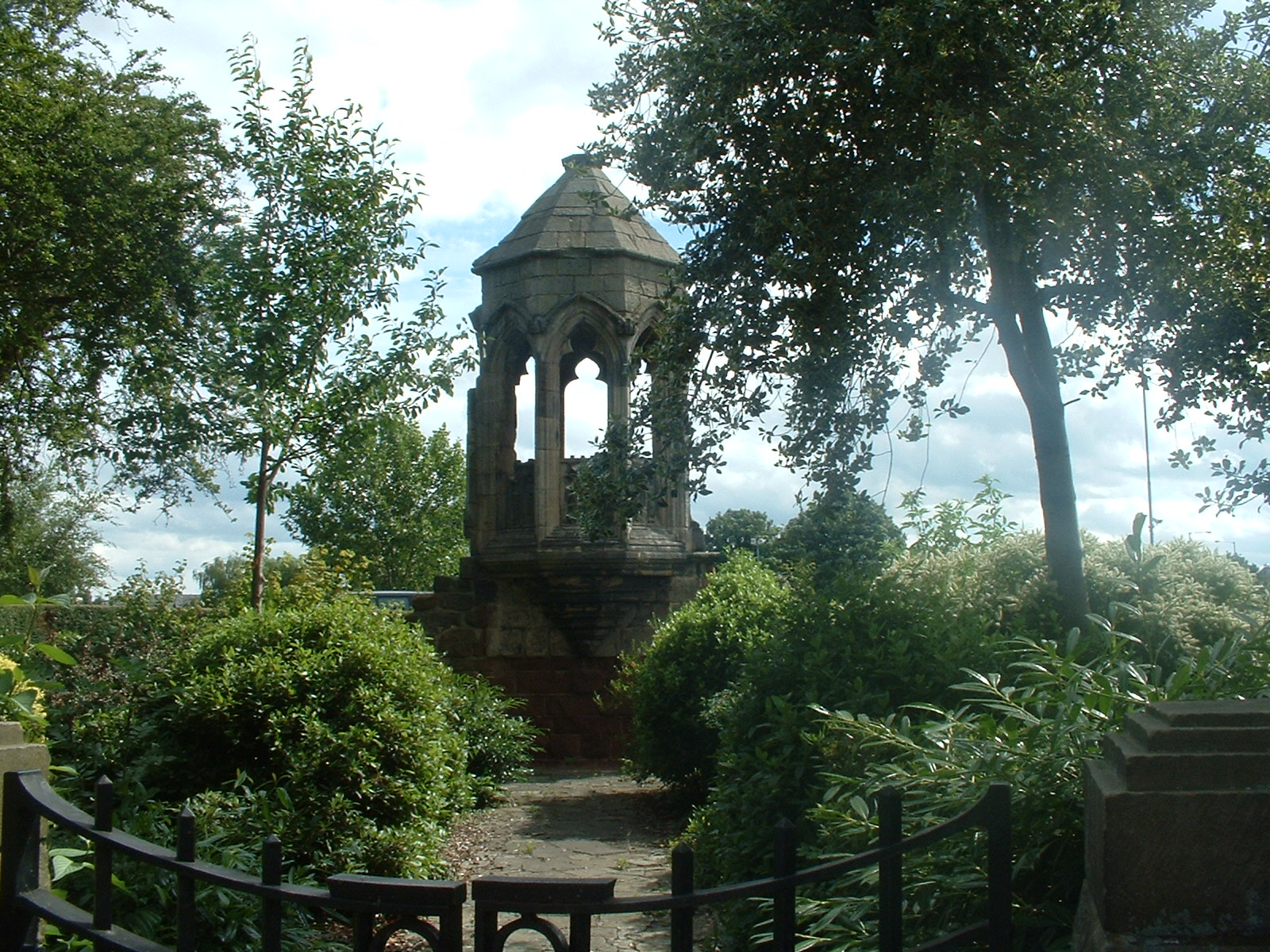
The old refectory pulpit

In 1539 Cromwell moved to the dissolution of the larger monasteries which had escaped earlier, Shrewsbury among them. Henry VIII personally devised a plan to form at least thirteen new dioceses so that most counties had a cathedral (a former monastery). This plan included making Shrewsbury Abbey a cathedral, but, while new dioceses were established at Bristol, Gloucester, Oxford, Peterborough, Westminster and Chester, the plans were never completed at Shrewsbury, Leicester, or Waltham. The 1539 legislation did not dissolve the greater abbeys, but only made arrangements for receiving on the king's behalf any "which hereafter shall happen to be dissolved, suppressed, renounced, relinquished, forfeited, given up, or by any other means come to King's Highness." Shrewsbury was one of the last to surrender, not because it put up any resistance, but because it lay at the end of the commissioners' circuit. Thomas Legh, one of the six clerks in chancery, officiated as the other commissioners demanded and received the surrender. The Abbey was dissolved on 24 January 1540, with a pension of £80 assigned to the abbot and £87 6s. 8d. to the 17 monks.

=== Post-Reformation ===
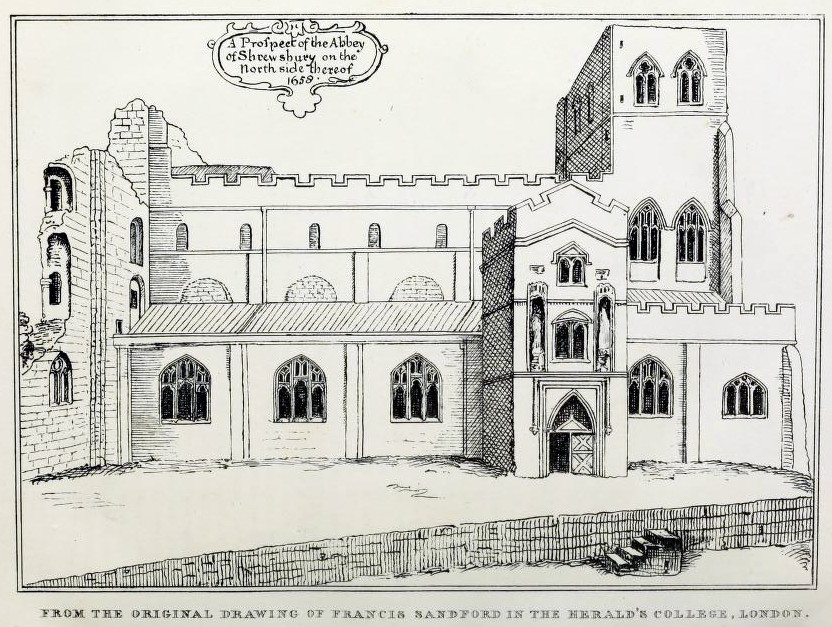
Sketch of Shrewsbury Abbey, 1658, by Francis Sandford. The third level, the then surviving clerestory, is clearly visible beneath the roof. There are also significant remains of the conventual buildings, which had been mined for repair materials in 1649.

The abbey site and surrounding land seem to have been rented to Thomas Forster of Evelith, Shifnal, and his wife, Elizabeth, and it was they who had to account to the Exchequer for the abbey temporalities around 1542. However, on 22 July 1546 the lands and site were sold to two property speculators, Edward Watson of Northampton and Henry Herdson, a London skinner. They had only a pecuniary interest in the abbey site and sold it the following day to William Langley, a Shrewsbury tailor. After five generations, the last of the Langley line left it in 1701 to Edward Baldwin, a Middle Temple lawyer. As he died without issue, it was passed via his sister to the Powys family.

The western part of the Abbey (nave, side aisles, porch and west tower) was preserved as a parish church and the remaining buildings were either re-used or demolished. The building suffered severely from neglect after the Reformation. The lead from the roof was removed, leading to decay and eventual collapse. The Norman clerestory was still in existence in the 17th century but it was later taken down and the roof was rebuilt immediately above the triforium. Considerable portions of the monastic buildings were still standing in 1743 but most have since been demolished, particularly when Thomas Telford built his A5 road through the Abbey grounds c.1836, removing much of the remaining evidence of the monastic layout. The old refectory pulpit is still visible across the road from the church and a single wall of an Abbey building, now an integral part of another building, remains. In the late 19th century the possibility of the Abbey becoming a cathedral, for a Shropshire-wide diocese, was again considered, but legislation to that effect, drafted in 1922, was defeated by one vote in the House of Lords in 1926.

=== Holy Cross Church ===
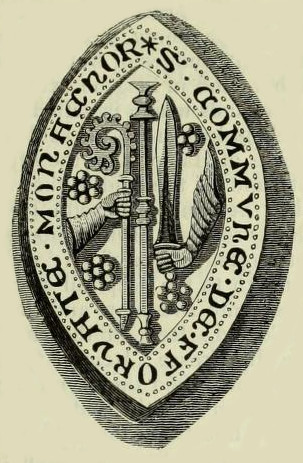
Medieval seal of the Abbey Foregate parish

The abbey's church had always doubled as the church for the Abbey Foregate parish, as it owed its origins to the church, founded by Siward the Fat. It was a vicarage controlled by the abbey community. Its title varied slightly through time. One William, is known to have served as clericus de Cruce, clerk of the Cross, in the early 13th century. Around mid-century, Henry was the vicar of the altar of the Holy Cross. A late medieval reference in the records of the Diocese of Hereford calls it Vicaria altaris Sancte Crucis, ecclesia paochialis de Foriete Monachorum: Vicarage of the altar of Holy Cross, parish church of the Monk's Foregate. From the brief reign of Edward V (1483) comes a document that appends Sancti Egidii or Saint Giles' to the name of the parish.

The parish had its own bailiffs, burgesses and seal, distinct from those of Shrewsbury itself. However, Shrewsbury's renewed municipal charter of 1586 brought Holy Cross parish under its civic authority. Until the Dissolution, the right to present to the vicarage, or advowson, belonged to the Abbot and convent of Shrewsbury Abbey. Then it passed to the Crown. However, in 1797, legislation was passed to transfer the advowson to Thomas Noel Hill, 2nd Baron Berwick of Attingham Park, in exchange for the patronage of some parishes he held in Suffolk.

The vicarage was fairly generously endowed with land and other income sources under an agreement made apparently by Abbot John Drayton in the 13th century. After the Dissolution of the Abbey, the parish church continued to be housed in the remains of the abbey church.

The church seems to have been damaged as a result of measures taken to fortify Shrewsbury after the Parliamentarians took the town in 1645. On 2 December 1646 the Parliamentarian County Committee instigated a survey and set aside timber for repairs. In 1649 the churchwardens paid Thomas Landford £10 1s. to repair breaches on the north side and east end, using stones from the old abbey buildings, and were able to offset against this 3s. they made by selling materials recovered from the damaged part of the church. In this period the church was generally called Abbey Foregate Church, as Puritans rejected the veneration of saints and relics. Under the ultimately abortive proposals for a Presbyterian polity in Shropshire, dated 29 April 1647, Abbey Foregate parish was part of the county's first classis, along with most of the churches in Shrewsbury and the surrounding area. However, the minister was not appointed an elder of the classis and the parishioners remained uncooperative with Puritan church governance even after the collapse of the Presbyterian scheme.

==== List of vicars ====
The following list is based on information in Owen and Blakeway's History of Shrewsbury and the Clergy of the Church of England database. CCEd references are given where available – broadly post-Reformation, but not under the Commonwealth.

===== Medieval =====
- William, known to have attested a deed during period 1216–28.
- Henry, first entitled vicar of the altar of the Holy Cross, witnessed a deed of which another witness was known to be living in 1241.
- Sir Gilbert, witnessed a deed in the time of Abbot William Upton, c. 1270.
- Sir William de Baschurch, vicar in the time of Abbot John Drayton, late 13th century.
- Sir Martin, died 1330.
- John de Hilton, occurs 1330.
- Roger de Humphreston, occurs 1334, left 1349.
- William Tandy, 1349–65.
- William le Bruys, occurs 1365.
- Sir Hamon, occurs 1398.
- William de Toonge (presumably of Tong, Shropshire), vicar in 1400, when he exchanged the parish with his successor.
- Sir Adam Tresale, 12 May 1400, resigned the free chapel of Greote in Hereford diocese to exchange for Holy Cross, which he exchanged again the following year.
- John Besselow, exchanged Wolstanton with Tresale to come to Holy Cross, but died following year.
- Sir Thomas More, 8 September 1402. Resigned to take up Shrewsbury Abbey's parish of Wrockwardine, 16 March 1426.
- Sir William Kemsey, 24 June 1426, resigned following year to exchange with successor.
- Sir John Gomond, 9 May 1427, previously vicar of Stottesdon. Presented by Abbey to rectory of Berrington, 1430.
- Sir Richard Lye, 29 July 1430, resigned immediately.
- Sir William Marshall, 1 August 1430.
- Sir Thomas Morris, occurs 1483, died 1503.
- Richard Baker, 1503–30
- William Hordley, 1530–58.

===== Post-Reformation =====
- Edmund Bennett, 24 May 1559 – 1610, also served as curate of Ballidon chapel in Derbyshire, 1561.
- Francis Gibbons, 16 February 1611 – 7 January 1640. Grandson of William Langley, he became a D.D. and chaplain to Charles I. He oversaw the installation of an altar rail at Holy Cross in 1635, a clear sign of Laudian sympathies. His brother, Richard Gibbons, was elected as one of the bailiffs in 1628 and was a leader of the High Church opposition on the corporation to the Puritans around William Rowley.
- James Logan, instituted 4 May 1640, resigned 1663. However, he seems to have been ejected in February 1645, when Parliamentarian forces took Shrewsbury.

===== Commonwealth and Protectorate =====
- Joshua Richardson, 1645–6, an Oxford graduate from Broughton, near Myddle, was installed by the new Parliamentarian regime. He soon left to become Rector of Myddle.
- John Beale, c. 1647–8.
- Moses Leigh, c. 1649-50
- John Bryan, c. 1650–59. A noted Puritan preacher and son of another, John Bryan of Coventry. The corporation had tried unsuccessfully to recruit the elder Bryan for St Mary's Church, Shrewsbury and the younger's installation at Holy Cross seems to have been seen as a compensation. He found the congregation intractably conservative and for a time could not administer the Lord's Supper because they refused to elect elders. Under advice from Richard Baxter, he investigated a move to St Julian's before moving to Chad church in Shrewsbury to replace Thomas Paget.
- Moses Leigh again, appointed by Richard Cromwell, under letters patent dated 3 May 1659.

===== Post-Restoration =====
- James Logan returned to office at Restoration, 1660. Resigned 1663.
- Timothy Hammond, July 1663. Buried 2 May 1671. CCEd currently has no records of him beyond 1665.
- Moses Leigh again, according to Owen and Blakeway, after he was put out of Norton in Hales in the Great Ejection of 1662 but later conformed. This third incumbency is not currently mentioned in CCEd, which has a lacuna.
- Samuel Pearson, 1676–1727. He was ordained a priest on 7 October 1676 and was made vicar of Holy Cross only two days later. He seems to have been popular in the parish, as attested in address from the parishioners to the bishop after his death on 16 November 1727.
- John Latham, 1727–50. Instituted on 28 November 1627, he quickly offended parishioners by proposing to remove a painting of the Crucifixion installed, according to the protesters, in the chancel by Pearson, although there is actually no chancel in the church. Bishop Chandler supported him and the painting was removed.
- William Gorsuch, 1750–82. Gorsuch was so meticulous in keeping records of births and deaths in the parish that his data was vital to the work of Richard Price, an important figure in the development of actuarial science.
- William Oakeley, 1782–1803. Oakeley was already rector of Eaton-under-Heywood and of Forton, Staffordshire when appointed to Holy Cross. In 1782 he became domestic chaplain to Bishop Cornwallis, who granted him special dispensation before instituting him vicar of Holy Cross. He did, however, resign the living at Eaton in 1786.
- Henry Lingen Burton, 1804–31, the first to be presented by Lord Berwick, also held at least two other livings while at Holy Cross: Atcham and Madeley, Shropshire.

==== Notable later vicars ====
- William Henry Draper (hymnwriter) - Vicar 1889-99
- Christopher Sidney Sims - Vicar 2002–2009, later Archdeacon of Walsall

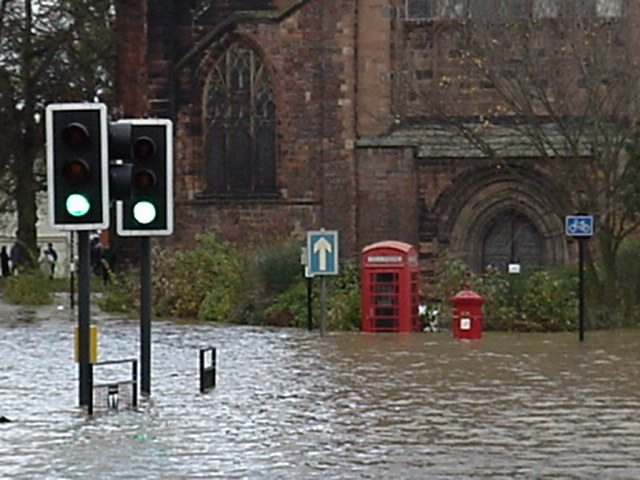
Flooding in Abbey Foregate, 2000

==== Notable curates ====
- Walsham How - later Bishop of Wakefield and hymnwriter - Curate 1848-51

=== Present-day church ===
Much of the original Norman 11th-century building survives in the present Abbey church, notably the short thick piers in the eastern half of the nave and the remnants of the original transepts. Stones with three sculptured figures, representing John the Baptist, Saint Winefride and St. Beuno, were found in a garden and have been restored to their original position in the screen. During the 19th century there were major restoration projects to restore the clerestory, and the east end of the church was redesigned by John Loughborough Pearson to contain a chancel and sanctuary. When the restoration work of 1886-1894 was dedicated in May 1894, the then Vicar, Rev William Henry Draper, wrote a hymn to mark the occasion, "In Our Day of Thanksgiving" (titled "Remembrance of Past Worshippers").

Inside the west end, on opposite walls, are stone war memorial tablets to parishioners who died serving in the separate World Wars. One name on the tablet for the First World War is war poet Wilfred Owen (as Lieutenant W.E.S. Owen M.C., Manchester Regiment). In the Abbey churchyard is a memorial sculpture entitled "Symmetry" and erected by the Wilfred Owen Association on his birth centenary (1993) by Paul de Monchaux, incorporating a line from Owen's poem Strange Meeting inscribed by Paul's wife, Ruth.

In recent times, the area surrounding the Abbey has been prone to flooding.

== Clock ==
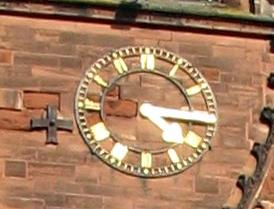
The clock on the bell tower, with unusual markings - instead of '10' being 'X' as is defined in Roman Numerals, 'f' is used. 9 is 'if', 10 simply 'f', 11 'fi' and 12 'fii'

The clock was built by J. B. Joyce & Co and installed in 1909 at a cost of £130 (equivalent to £13,379 in 2025). It was the gift of the Shropshire Horticultural Society.

== Bells ==
At the Dissolution, the Abbey had two rings of five bells, one in the current tower and one in a central tower. In 1673, a ring of eight was cast by George Oldfield of Nottingham and these were replaced over time by the present bells. Nine peals were rung at the Abbey in the eighteenth century. The bells were rung full-circle until at least 1895, but in 1909 concern over the safety of the tower led to the bells being removed and rehung without wheels in a new frame. They are currently sounded by an Ellacombe apparatus, whereby they can be rung by a single person.

- Treble and 2nd - Thomas Mears II of London, 1825
- 3rd - John Taylor & Co of Loughborough, 1884
- 4th - John Briant of Hertford, 1812
- 5th - Charles and George Mears of London, 1846
- 6th - Abel Rudhall of Gloucester, 1745
- 7th - John Warner & Sons of London, 1877
- Tenor - Abraham Rudhall of Gloucester, 1713

== Music ==
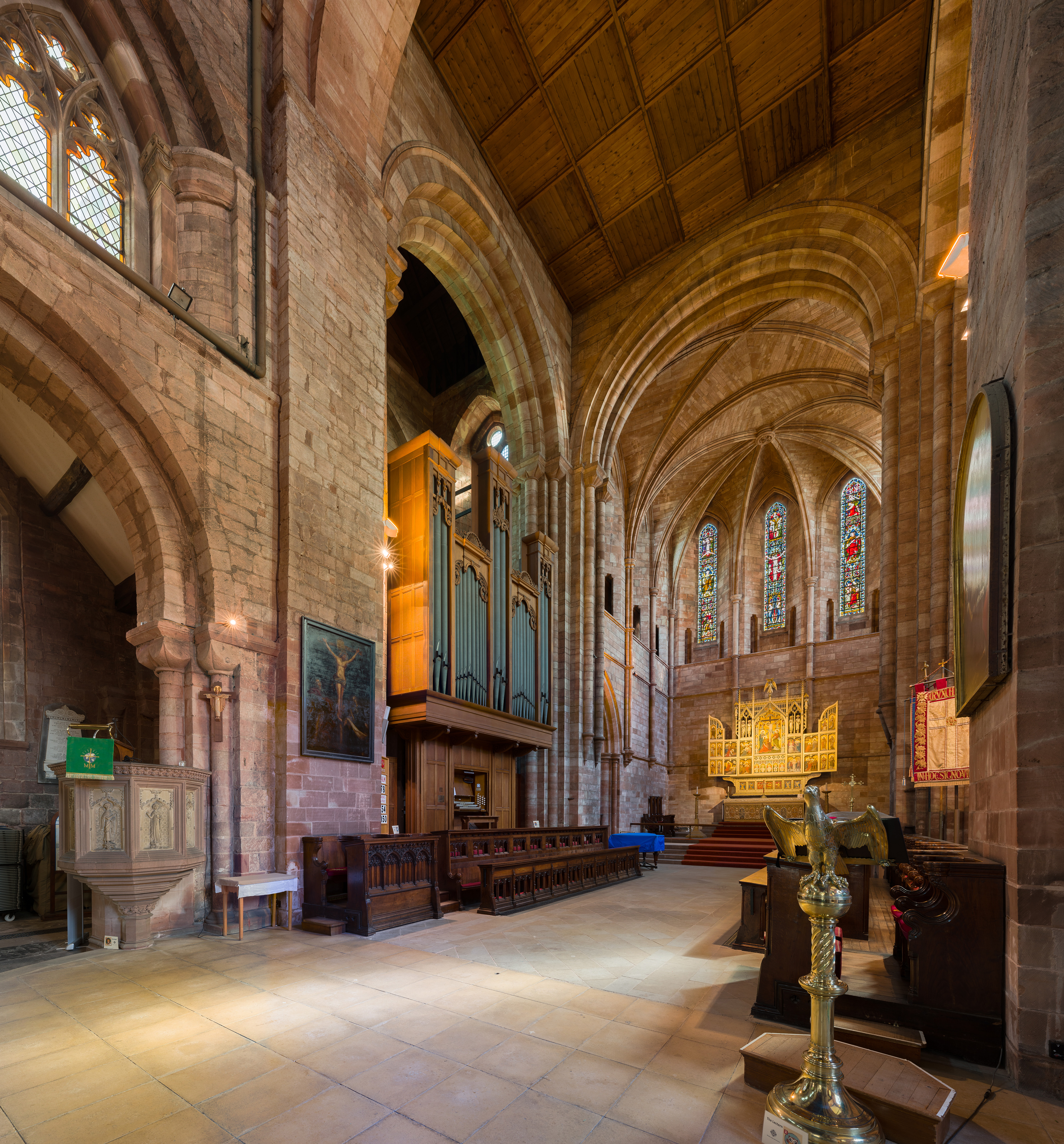
The choir stalls and organ

=== Choirs ===
The Abbey has a long-standing reputation for excellence in liturgical music. Records from the mid-19th century show the existence of a choir of boys and men, which was maintained until after the Second World War. The current choir consists of a mixed adult choir which sings the majority of services. The choir also has choral scholars. The choir regularly visits cathedrals to sing services in the absence of the cathedral choir.

=== Organ ===
The Abbey has an organ, built in 1911 by William Hill and Son. It was designed to be on the scale of a cathedral organ, but lack of funds meant the original scheme was not completed. Some stops were subsequently added, though Hill's original specification was not completed. The organ has an Edwardian tone and serves the Abbey church.

The console was also in original condition and was unusual for the right side positioning of the swell pedals, and for the sight of stop stubs (7) for the "missing" ranks. With the passage of time, the pneumatics became increasingly unreliable and there were also problems with the wind systems.

A scheme for the organ's renovation and completion was launched in 2011 to appeal for the necessary £400,000 for the scheme to start. That appeal was unsuccessful, but replacement of the original blower did greatly improved both the tone and the reliability of the organ.

After years of fund raising, and many discussions of many different possibilities, a scheme to renovate and complete the organ was finally agreed by the PCC, and work began in March 2020, immediately before the first period of COVID lockdown. Work continued through to the summer of 2021, and an opening recital on the newly renovated and completed organ was given in October of that year.

The organ builder for the scheme was GO Organbuilders, assisted by a number of other specialists. The scheme of work involved replacing all the original tubular pneumatic actions with electric pneumatics, cleaning the whole instrument and all its pipework, restoring the choir organ expression box to its original size, lifting reservoirs and blowers to a higher position creating much needed vestry space, adapting and replacing all the wind trunking, and completing Hill's original specification with limited, in-keeping additions. The Abbey was grateful to the Rector and Churchwardens of St Bartholomew the Great, London for their generous donation of much of the added pipework and chests. The original Hill console was also restored, and electrified, and the two expression box pedals centred. The whole project cost £234,000, funded by donations received over a long period of time, and crucially from generous grants from various Trusts. The completed Hill organ is now capable of filling the large Abbey space with glorious sound, and has the flexibility needed to accompany the choir, lead congregational singing and be used for teaching and for organ recitals.

=== Organists and Directors of Music ===
- 1806-1820 Thomas Tomlins
- 1820-1831 John Amott
- 1831-1847 John Hiles
- 1847-1865 William Fletcher
- 1865-1892 James Warhurst
- 1892-1919 Percy William Pilcher
- 1919-1922 -
- 1922-1937 George Walter Tonkiss
- 1937–1945 G A Turner
- 1945–1947 Edgar Daniels
- 1947-1974 John R Stanier
- 1974–1976 Ray Willis
- 1976–1978 Robert Gillings
- 1978–1984 Kenneth Greenway
- 1984–1986 Charles Jones
- 1986-1986 Sean Tucker
- 1986–1988 Paul Derrett
- 1988-1992 Keith Orrell
- 1992-1994 James Lloyd-Thomas
- 1995–1999 William Hayward
- 2000–2006 David Leeke
- 2007–2010 Tim Mills
- 2011-2013 Tom Edwards
- 2013-2015 Duncan Boutwood
- 2015-2016 Paul David Watson (Acting)
- 2016- Peter Smith

== Cadfael ==
Shrewsbury Abbey is the setting for The Cadfael Chronicles by Ellis Peters, in which the fictional Brother Cadfael is embroiled in a series of historical murder mysteries. The character of Cadfael is a Welsh Benedictine monk living at the Abbey in the first half of the 12th century. The historically accurate stories are set between about 1135 and about 1145, during The Anarchy, the destructive contest for the crown of England between King Stephen and Empress Maud.

== Burials ==
=== Burials at the Abbey ===
- Roger de Montgomerie, 1st Earl of Shrewsbury
- Hugh of Montgomery, 2nd Earl of Shrewsbury
- William FitzAlan, Lord of Oswestry

=== The churchyard ===
Most of the present churchyard covers the site of the east end of the monastic church. It was created as the town's first public cemetery, having been bought by a group of gentlemen to avoid the ground being sold in individual plots. This was incorporated by an Act of Parliament obtained in 1840 and consecrated in 1841, but was commercially unsuccessful; 148 burials took place between the latter year and 1888, when it was sold back to the Abbey Church. The municipal General Cemetery at Longden Road (opened 1856) overtook the Abbey Cemetery in public usage.

== See also ==
- Diocese of Lichfield
- Bishop of Shrewsbury
- Grade I listed churches in Shropshire
- Listed buildings in Shrewsbury (outer areas)
- List of English abbeys, priories and friaries serving as parish churches
- List of ecclesiastical restorations and alterations by J. L. Pearson
