= Listed buildings in Great Ness =

Great Ness is a civil parish in Shropshire, England. It contains 26 listed buildings that are recorded in the National Heritage List for England. Of these, one is listed at Grade I, the highest of the three grades, one is at Grade II*, the middle grade, and the others are at Grade II, the lowest grade. The parish contains the village of Great Ness and smaller settlements, including Alderton, Kinton, and Nesscliffe, and is otherwise rural. Most of the listed buildings are houses, farmhouses and farm buildings, and the other listed buildings include a church and items in the churchyard, a hotel, milestones, and a war memorial.

== Key ==
| Grade | Criteria |
|---|---|
| I | Buildings of exceptional interest, sometimes considered to be internationally important |
| II* | Particularly important buildings of more than special interest |
| II | Buildings of national importance and special interest |

== Buildings ==
| Name and location | Photograph | Date | Notes | Grade |
|---|---|---|---|---|
| St Andrew's Church; 52.76550°N 2.89425°W | | 13th century | The oldest parts of the church are the tower and the nave, which are in red sandstone with a tile roof, the chancel is in grey sandstone with a slate roof and dates from the 14th century. The belfry was rebuilt or added in the 17th century, the vestry in the 19th century, and the church was partly restored in 1880. The church consists of a nave, a south porch, a chancel, a north vestry, and a west tower. The tower has three stages, diagonal buttresses, an embattled parapet, and a pyramidal cap with a weathervane. The nave and tower are in Early English style, and the chancel is in Decorated style. | I |
| Churchyard cross 52.76532°N 2.89402°W | — | 14th or 15th century | The remains of the cross are in the churchyard of St Andrew's Church. It is in red sandstone, and has an octagonal plan, four steps, and a truncated shaft with a chamfered base. The cross is also a Scheduled Monument. | II |
| Kinton Manor; 52.76967°N 2.93364°W | — | 15th century (probable) | The house was extended in the 16th century and remodelled in the 19th century. The original part is timber framed with brick nogging and cruck construction, the extension and rebuilding is in sandstone and brick, and the roof is slated. There are two storeys, the original hall house has three bays, with a projecting gabled wing at the front, and there are extensions on both sides. In the angle of the wing is a lean-to porch, the windows are casements, and inside is at least one full cruck truss. | II |
| 4 Felton Butler; 52.75296°N 2.90042°W | — | Late 16th century (probable) | A timber framed cottage with brick nogging on a stone plinth and with a slate roof. The east wall has a brick plinth and a rendered gable, and the south wall is in brick. There is one storey and an attic, and probably two bays. The windows are casements, and there is a flat-roofed dormer. | II |
| Grove Farmhouse; 52.77019°N 2.93614°W | — | Late 16th century | The farmhouse was partly rebuilt in the 18th century, and later enlarged. It is basically timber framed and has wattle and daub and brick infill, it is partly rendered, the extensions are in red brick, and it has slate roofs. There are two storeys, some windows are casements and others are sashes. | II |
| Alderton Hall; 52.75023°N 2.91167°W | — | 1591 | The house was extended in the 18th century and remodelled in the 19th century. It is timber framed with plaster infill and has slate roofs. There is an L-shaped plan consisting of a hall range with two storeys and three bays, and a cross-wing of two storeys and an attic. The gables are jettied with moulded bressumers and pierced and scalloped bargeboards and finials. The windows vary, and include cross-windows, casements, sash windows. and windows that are mullioned or mullioned and transomed. | II* |
| Felton Butler Manor; 52.75198°N 2.90091°W | — | c. 1600 | A farmhouse that was later extended and remodelled, the original part is timber framed with brick nogging on a red sandstone plinth, the rebuilding and refacing is in red sandstone and brick, partly rendered, and the roof is slated. There are two storeys, and a T-shaped plan with a hall range of two bays, and a cross-wing of two or three bays. In the centre is a two-storey gabled porch with a chamfered Tudor arched opening, a moulded cornice and an embattled top, and the doorway has a moulded architrave. Most of the windows are casements, there are also sash windows, French windows, and blocked mullioned windows. | II |
| Holly Lodge; 52.76993°N 2.93498°W | — | Early 17th century (probable) | The house was extended in the 18th century. The original part is timber framed with brick nogging, the extension is in brick, the gable end wall is rendered, and the roof is slated. There is one storey and an attic, the windows are casements, and there are three gabled eaves dormers. | II |
| Startlewood Farmhouse; 52.77955°N 2.90766°W | — | Early 17th century (probable) | The farmhouse was later extended and remodelled. Its original part is timber framed with brick nogging on a red sandstone plinth, the rebuilding and refacing is in red sandstone and brick, and the roof is slated. There are two storeys and an attic, and an L-shaped plan with a main range of three bays, a rear one-bay wing, and a single-storey lean-to extension on the left. There is a gabled brick porch, and the windows are lattice-glazed casements. | II |
| The White House and White House Cottage; 52.76447°N 2.89338°W | — | Early 17th century | A house and cottage, later altered, timber framed on a stone plinth, and rendered with slate roofs. There is a three-bay main range with two storeys and rear outshuts, and a cross-wing to the left with two storeys, an attic and a cellar. It has a gabled porch, and most of the windows are casements. | II |
| Kinton Tithe and Tithe Barn; 52.76975°N 2.93392°W | — | Early 18th century | Originally a barn, later converted into two houses, it is partly timber framed with weatherboarding, and partly in brick, and has a 20th-century pantile roof with crowstepped gables. There are two storeys, the windows are casements, and in the left gable end are ventilation holes. | II |
| Stable and granary, Alderton Hall; 52.75016°N 2.91227°W | — | Mid 18th century | The farm buildings are in red brick on a red sandstone plinth, and the roof is partly slated, and partly in asbestos tiles, and has parapeted gables. There are two storeys and a loft, a front of two bays, and a two-storey rear wing There are cross-windows and a doorway, all with segmental heads, and in the gable end are loft doors. | II |
| The Poplars; 52.76434°N 2.89299°W | — | Mid to late 18th century | The house is in red brick on a chamfered plinth, with red sandstone dressings, a dentil eaves cornice, and a slate roof with parapeted and coped gables. There are two storeys, an attic and a basement, and three bays. The central doorway has a moulded architrave, a rectangular fanlight, and a flat hood on shaped brackets. The windows are sashes with segmental heads, there are three gabled eaves dormers, and a segmental-headed basement doorway. | II |
| Pair of Wingfield memorials 52.76539°N 2.89395°W | — | Mid to late 18th century | The memorials are in the churchyard of St Andrew's Church, one is to the memory of Thomas Wingfield, and the inscription on the other is illegible. They are chest tombs in sandstone and each has a moulded plinth, baluster-shaped sides and ends, and a flat top with a moulded cornice. | II |
| Great Ness House; 52.76357°N 2.89763°W | — | Late 18th century | The house is in red brick on a plinth, with red sandstone dressings, and a two-span slate roof with parapeted and coped gables. There are three storeys and a basement, a double depth plan, three bays, and a two-storey service wing on the left with a hipped roof. On the front is a porch dating from about 1830, with two pairs of Greek Doric columns, and an entablature with a frieze, a moulded cornice, and a blocking course. At the top of the middle bay is an open triangular pediment containing a painted oculus in the tympanum, and the windows are sashes. | II |
| Ness Strange; 52.76414°N 2.89640°W | — | 1778 | A small country house, later altered and extended, and divided into separate dwellings. It is in red brick on a stone plinth, with grey sandstone dressings, a sill band, a frieze, a moulded cornice, a coped parapet, and a two-span slate roof. There are three storeys, a front of seven bays, and a service wing with two storeys and an attic. On the front are two full-height canted bay windows and sash windows, and at the rear is a full-height octagonal bay window. The doorway has been moved to the service wing, and has Doric three-quarter columns and an open triangular pediment. | II |
| Kinton House; 52.77000°N 2.93598°W | — | Late 18th or early 19th century | A farmhouse, later a private house, it was later enlarged, and is in red brick with a dentil eaves cornice and a slate roof. It has an L-shaped plan, consisting of a three-storey block, and a two-storey rear wing. On the front is a Tuscan sandstone porch with two columns, a frieze, a moulded cornice, and a blocking course, and the windows are sashes. | II |
| Granary, cartshed and coach house, Ness Strange; 52.76454°N 2.89685°W | — | Late 18th or early 19th century | The farm buildings are in red sandstone, there are two storeys, the upper storey at the front being timber framed with red brick nogging, and the roof is slated and hipped. They contain doorways and a loft door approached by external steps, and the doors in the coach house are in an elliptical arch. | II |
| Edwards memorial 52.76562°N 2.89400°W | — | 1820 | The memorial is in the churchyard of St Andrew's Church, and is to the memory of members of the Edwards family. It is a pedestal tomb in grey sandstone and has a square plan. There is a moulded plinth, recessed panels, and a moulded cornice. On the top is an urn with scalloped lower parts, a fluted band, carved garlands, oval patera, a shield, a moulded cornice, and a domed top. | II |
| Nesscliffe Hotel; 52.76629°N 2.91514°W | | Early 19th century | The hotel is in red brick on a chamfered plinth, with a dentil eaves cornice, and a slate roof with parapeted and coped gables. There are three storeys and a basement, a front of five bays, a recessed two-storey wing to the right with a hipped roof, and a two-storey rear wing in red sandstone. Steps from both sides lead up to a central porch with a segmental archway, a moulded cornice, and a pierced terracotta parapet. The windows are sashes. | II |
| The Gatehouse; 52.78080°N 2.93315°W | — | Early 19th century | A former toll house, it is in stone with a slate roof. There are two storeys and three bays, and a central doorway. | II |
| Milestone near Wolfshead Farmhouse; 52.78189°N 2.93452°W | | 1826–27 | The milestone is on the west side of the original A5 road, and is in limestone. It has a shallow-pitched top and chamfered corners, and carries a cast iron plate inscribed with the distances in miles to Holyhead and to "SALOP" (Shrewsbury). | II |
| Milestone near Nesscliffe; 52.77098°N 2.91900°W | | 1826–27 | The milestone is on the west side of the original A5 road, and is in limestone. It has a shallow-pitched top and chamfered corners, and carries a cast iron plate inscribed with the distances in miles to Holyhead and to "SALOP" (Shrewsbury). | II |
| Milestone near Stone House; 52.76168°N 2.90273°W | | 1826–27 | The milestone is on the west side of the original A5 road, and is in limestone. It has a shallow-pitched top and chamfered corners, and carries a cast iron plate inscribed with the distances in miles to Holyhead and to "SALOP" (Shrewsbury). | II |
| Wilcott Hall; 52.76175°N 2.92245°W | — | Mid to late 19th century | The house has an earlier timber framed core with plastered infill on a brick plinth and tile roofs. There is an irregular plan, two storeys and an attic. The house contains a flat-roofed square bay window and a canted bay window in the ground floor, and above are casement windows. | II |
| Nesscliffe War Memorial; 52.76803°N 2.91654°W | | {1920 | The war memorial stands on a platform by the side of the road, and is approached by steps. It is in red sandstone, and its design is based on a Celtic cross, with bosses in the centre and on the arms. It has a tapered shaft on a square plinth and base. On the plinth are panels of York stone with inscriptions and the names of those lost in the two world Wars. | II |
