= Shrewsbury Business Park =

Business park in Shrewsbury, Shropshire, England

Coordinates: 52.692°N 2.716°W

The Shrewsbury Business Park is a commercial development on the outskirts of Shrewsbury, Shropshire (at Emstrey). Construction commenced in late 2001 on the 30-acre (120,000 m^{2}), £25 million site, and is still ongoing. Almost 200,000-square-foot (19,000 m^{2}) of business premises have been delivered, largely attributed to Phase One of the scheme. Over 1,000 people are based there.

The idea was first promoted by local developer the Alaska Group, which entered into a partnership with Shropshire County Council. Mainly offices, the business park includes a Holiday Inn Express Hotel and a children's daycare centre. Plans exist for a cafe retail unit at the heart of the development.

Alaska Group was founded in London in 1994 in a former fur factory known as the Alaska Works, where skins were imported from Alaska. The company has no other connection with Alaska, however it gave the Park several place names from that State. The main route through the Park, Sitka Drive, is named after the State tree of Alaska. Other names include Anchorage Avenue, Mt McKinley Building, Bering House and Juneau House.

Located around 3 miles (5 km) south east of the town centre of Shrewsbury, Shropshire's county town, the business park lies on the junction of the A5 bypass and the B4380, near to Emstrey. The park's appeal is partly thanks to excellent transport links via the nearby M54 motorway to Telford, Wolverhampton and Birmingham, while being near to a fine medieval town and beautiful countryside.

Other business park developments in and around the town include the Oxon Business Park to the West of the town centre and the Battlefield Enterprise Park to the North, and Abbey Lawn next to Shrewsbury Abbey, just across the Severn from the town centre.

== Buildings ==
The Alaska Building

A typical building style on the site

The park's buildings are a combination of fully customised modern and traditional structures, all with dedicated parking.

The Creative Quarter is home to five offices, The Alaska Building (Pictured Right), Global House, Mercury House, Jupiter House and the Community Council Building

Mtech's office, seen bottom right, is typical of some of the smaller properties available on the development.

The Professional Quarter is of more traditional brick design and includes professional clients including Handelsbanken.

== Phase 2 ==
Work started in 2008 on phase 2 of Shrewsbury Business Park after Alaska Group agreed a new Partnership with Shropshire Council, following the success of phase 1. Another 220,000 square feet (20,000 m^{2}) is planned and the first three buildings are now nearing completion. Deutsche Bank are the first occupiers of phase 2.
