= Listed buildings in Myddle, Broughton and Harmer Hill =

Myddle, Broughton and Harmer Hill is a civil parish in Shropshire, England. It contains 24 listed buildings that are recorded in the National Heritage List for England. All the listed buildings are designated at Grade II, the lowest of the three grades, which is applied to "buildings of national importance and special interest". The parish contains the villages and smaller settlements of Alderton, Broughton, Harmer Hill, and Myddle, and the surrounding countryside. The oldest listed buildings are ruins; the remains of a church, a churchyard cross, and a castle. Most of the other listed buildings are houses, cottages, farmhouses and farm buildings, the earliest of which are timber framed. The rest of the listed buildings include churches and a chapel, a sundial in a churchyard, a public house, two mileposts, and a village pump and associated structures.

== Buildings ==
Name and location	Photograph	Date	Notes
Remains of the Church of St Mary; 52.81099°N 2.74143°W	—	Late 12th century	The church was replaced in 1858, and partly demolished. The remains are in sandstone, and consist of part of the chancel measuring about 10 metres (33 ft) by 7 metres (23 ft), and up to about 1 metre (3 ft 3 in) high.
Myddle Castle; 52.80704°N 2.78952°W		c. 1307	The castle has been a ruin for centuries. The remains are in red sandstone with dressings in buff sandstone, and consist of part of a corner stair turret, and two sides of the inner retaining wall of the moat about 46 metres (151 ft) long and 1.5 metres (4 ft 11 in) high. The castle ruins are also a Scheduled Monument.
Churchyard cross 52.81089°N 2.74154°W	—	15th century	The remains of the cross are in the churchyard of the former Church of St Mary. It is in sandstone, and consists of an octagonal base with three steps and a socket for the shaft.
Balderton Hall Cottages; 52.81028°N 2.77270°W	—	c. 1600	A house that has been altered and divided into two dwellings. It is timber framed with brick nogging on a rendered plinth, the south wall has been rebuilt in brick and rendered, and the roof is slated. There is one storey and attics, and three bays. Most of the windows are casements, there are horizontally-sliding sash windows, two gabled eaves dormers on the front, and three at the rear.
Broughton Farmhouse; 52.81255°N 2.74720°W	—	c. 1600	The farmhouse was later extended and remodelled. The original part is timber framed with brick nogging, it is pebbledashed, and underbuilt in brick, on a red sandstone plinth and with quoins. The extension is in brick and the roofs are slated. The original part has two storeys, an attic and a basement, a front of three bays, and there is a service wing at the rear. The doorway has a moulded architrave, a rectangular fanlight, and a gabled timber porch with baluster sides, pierced and shaped bargeboards, and a finial. The windows are casements.
Inglenook; 52.80689°N 2.79248°W	—	c. 1600	The house has been altered and divided into two dwellings. It is timber framed with brick nogging, the eaves have been raised in brick and painted to resemble timber framing, and it has an asbestos slate roof. There are two storeys, four bays, and extensions to the rear. The house has two gabled porches, and the windows are casements.
The Oaks; 52.80584°N 2.80165°W	—	c. 1600	The house has been altered and extended. It is timber framed with brick nogging, and has a thatched roof. There is one storey and an attic, two bays, later flanking single-storey extensions with hipped slate roofs, and a rear lean-to. On the front is a gabled porch, and the windows are casements.
The Red Lion Public House; 52.81045°N 2.78902°W		Early 17th century	The public house was later extended by the addition of a wing at right angles, giving an L-shaped plan. The original part is timber framed with red brick nogging and partly rebuilt in red brick, the extension is in red sandstone, and the roof is slated. The original part has two storeys and an attic, and five bays, and the extension has one storey and an attic, and two bays. The attic of the gable end facing the road is jettied, and in the angle of the ranges is a gabled porch. Most of the windows in the original part are casements with lattice glazing, in the extension they are also casements, and there are two gabled half-dormers.
St Peter's Church; 52.80748°N 2.79120°W		c. 1634	The oldest part of the church is the tower, the nave and chancel were built in 1744, and the church was extensively remodelled in 1857–58 by John Cunningham, who added the porch and the south aisle. The church is built in red sandstone with grey sandstone dressings and tile roofs, and is in Decorated style. It consists of a nave and a chancel in one cell, a north porch, a wide south aisle, a vestry and organ chamber at the southeast, and a west tower. The tower has three stages, diagonal buttresses, a moulded string course with gargoyles on the corners, a chamfered and embattled parapet, and a pyramidal cap with a weathervane.
Former house 52.80689°N 2.79416°W		Mid 17th century (probable)	The house was extended in the 19th century. The original part is timber framed with infill in wattle and daub and red brick, the extension is in red sandstone, on a red sandstone plinth, and with an asbestos slate roof. There are two storeys, and an L-shaped plan, with two bays, and the later wing to the south. The windows are casements, and inside are timber-framed dividing walls.
Sundial; 52.80727°N 2.79121°W	—	Late 17th or early 18th century	The sundial is in the churchyard of St Peter's Church. It is in grey sandstone, and consists of a bulbous baluster with a large base and a square top of three circular steps. On the top is a copper dial plate and a gnomon.
Alderton Hall Farmhouse; 52.81108°N 2.75074°W	—	Early 18th century	The farmhouse incorporates a 17th-century core, and was extended in the 19th century. The core is timber framed with brick nogging on a sandstone plinth, partly rendered, the main part is in grey sandstone on a moulded plinth, and has pilasters and a coved cornice, the extension is in red sandstone, and the roof is tiled. There is one storey and an attic, and an L-shaped plan, with three bays, a single-storey kitchen wing at the rear, and a two-bay lean-to in the angle, The doorway has a moulded surround, a rectangular fanlight, a pulvinated frieze, and a triangular pediment. The windows are cross-windows, and there are two gabled half-dormers. Inside are timber-framed partition walls.
Barn northwest of Alderton Hall Farmhouse; 52.81127°N 2.75082°W	—	Early 18th century	The barn incorporates earlier materials. It is timber framed with some red brick nogging on a sandstone plinth, clad in corrugated iron and weatherboarding, and with a corrugated iron roof. There are three bays, and it contains large central opposed doors.
The Old Rectory and garden wall 52.80830°N 2.79108°W	—	c. 1747	The rectory, later a private house, was extended by the addition of a parallel range at the rear in the 19th century. It is in red brick with sandstone dressings, partly rendered, on a chamfered stone plinth, with a dentil eaves cornice, and a slate roof with parapeted gables. There are two storeys, an attic and a basement, and three bays. The windows are sashes with painted lintels and triple keystones, and there are three eaves dormers with casements and triangular pedimented gables. In the left return is a full-height canted bay window, and the door is in the right return. Attached at the rear is a coped red brick garden wall containing a round-headed archway and a reset datetone.
Shotton Farmhouse; 52.79111°N 2.75125°W	—	Mid to late 18th century	The farmhouse, which was extended in the 19th century, is in red brick on a red sandstone plinth, with a dentil eaves cornice. The extension is in red sandstone, and the roof is slated. There are three storeys, three bays, and a two-storey extension at the rear on the left. The doorway, which has a fanlight, and the windows, which are casements, have segmental heads.
Yorton House; 52.80134°N 2.73734°W	—	Late 18th century	A farmhouse, later a private house, it was remodelled and extended in about 1830. It is in red brick, stuccoed on the front, on a plinth, with a plat band, a dentil eaves cornice, and a hipped slate roof. There are two and three storeys, a front of three bays, and a later recessed wing with two bays. The central doorway is approached by a flight of nine steps that have curving flanking walls with square end piers and globe finials. There are double doors with a reeded architrave, a segmental fanlight, moulded imposts, and a reeded archivolt with a keystone. The windows are sashes.
Farm buildings northeast of Alderton Farmhouse; 52.81180°N 2.75005°W	—	Late 18th to early 19th century	The farm buildings consist of a barn with a stable to the right and a horse engine house at the rear. The barn is timber framed with red brick nogging on a red sandstone plinth and has a slate roof. It contains doors, a window and vents. The stable is in red brick on a red sandstone plinth, with a granary above, and a corrugated iron roof. External steps lead up to a loft doorway. The horse engine house is polygonal, and has red sandstone piers and a hipped slate roof.
Alderton House; 52.81003°N 2.75123°W	—	Early 19th century	A farmhouse, later a private house, it is in red brick with a hipped slate roof. There are two storeys at the front, three storeys at the rear, and a front of three bays. The house has a grey sandstone tetrastyle Greek Doric porch, with paired fluted columns, unfluted pilasters, and an entablature, and a doorway with a rectangular fanlight. The windows on the front are sashes, and in the right return are casement windows with segmental heads.
Alderton Farmhouse; 52.81152°N 2.75009°W	—	Early 19th century	The farmhouse incorporates an 18th-century core. It is in red brick on a red sandstone plinth, with a dentil eaves cornice, and a two-span slate roof, hipped to the east. There are two storeys, three bays, and a one-storey lean-to at the rear. The central doorway has panelled pilaster strips, a three-part fanlight, a moulded cornice, and a bracketed lead hood. The windows are sashes.
Presbyterian Church of Wales Chapel and Chapel House; 52.79889°N 2.75949°W		1833	The chapel and adjoining manse are in red sandstone with hipped slate roofs. The chapel is in Gothic style, and has three bays, and windows with pointed heads and Y-tracery. The porch has circular columns with square capitals, and a pointed arch, and above it is a datestone. The manse, at right angles, has two storeys, a porch with a hipped roof, and sash windows.
Milepost near Alderton Cottage; 52.80847°N 2.74991°W	—	Early to mid 19th century	The milepost is on the east side of the B5476 road. It is in cast iron, and has a triangular section, a chamfered top, and beaded corners. The milepost is inscribed with the distances in miles to "SALOP" (Shrewsbury) and to Wem. At the rear is a supporting sandstone block.
Milepost near the Bridgewater Arms; 52.79452°N 2.75617°W	—	Early to mid 19th century	The milepost is on the east side of the B5476 road. It is in cast iron, and has a triangular section, a chamfered top, and beaded corners. The milepost is inscribed with the distances in miles to "SALOP" (Shrewsbury) and to Wem.
St Mary's Church; 52.80626°N 2.73650°W		1858	The church is in sandstone with a slate roof, and is in early Decorated style. It consists of a nave and chancel in one cell, and a north vestry. On the west gable is a square bellcote with three openings on each side, and a steep pyramidal roof. The windows are lancets, and the east window has three lights, the middle light with an ogee head.
Pump, trough and enclosure 52.81022°N 2.78914°W		Mid to late 19th century	The pump is in cast iron, and consists of a circular shaft with moulded rings, a fluted top with a splayed spout and a double-curved handle, and a domed cap with a spike finial. In front of it is a rectangular grey sandstone trough, and all is enclosed by semicircular sandstone walls with rounded coping.
