= Harmer Hill =

Village in Shropshire, England

Coordinates: 52.799°N 2.766°W

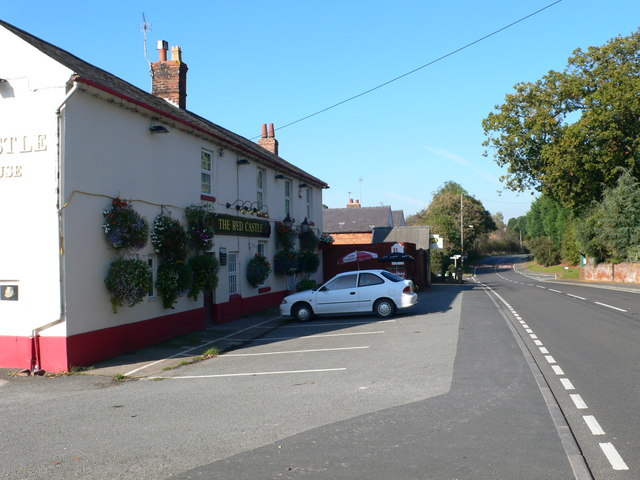
- The Red Castle public house, Harmer Hill (Closed for business 2018)

- Location within Shropshire
- OS grid reference: SJ483226
- Civil parish: Myddle, Broughton and Harmer Hill
- Unitary authority: Shropshire
- Ceremonial county: Shropshire
- Region: West Midlands
- Country: England
- Sovereign state: United Kingdom
- Post town: SHREWSBURY
- Postcode district: SY4
- Dialling code: 01939
- Police: West Mercia
- Fire: Shropshire
- Ambulance: West Midlands
- UK Parliament: North Shropshire

Harmer Hill is a village in Shropshire, England located on the A528 south of Wem and north of Shrewsbury.

The name Harmer comes from the two words "hare" and "mere", as there was a lake situated in a plain below the hill, but it was drained in the 15th century for farm land. The village was home to two pubs, the Bridgewater Arms and the Red Castle; the Red Castle closed in 2018. There is a village hall and Presbyterian chapel with its own burial ground. Harmer Hill is said to be haunted, notably by a "White Lady".

Queen Mary's brother, the Marquess of Cambridge, lived at nearby Shotton Hall from after World War I until his death in 1927. Helen Morgan, Liberal Democrat MP, lives in Harmer Hill, which is in her North Shropshire constituency.

== See also ==
- Listed buildings in Myddle and Broughton
