= William Henry Draper (hymnwriter) =

English hymnodist (1855–1933)

- Born: 19 December 1855; Kenilworth, Warwickshire
- Died: 9 August 1933 (aged 77); Clifton, Bristol
- Occupations: Hymnwriter, Anglican priest
- Era: Romantic

William Henry Draper (19 December 1855 – 9 August 1933) was an English hymnodist and clergyman who composed about sixty hymns. He is most famous for "All Creatures of Our God and King", his translation of "Canticle of the Sun" by Francis of Assisi.

== Biography ==
Draper was born in Kenilworth, Warwickshire on 19 December 1855, the fifth son of Henry and Lucy Mary Draper. He attended Cheltenham College, and went up to Keble College, Oxford as an exhibitioner. He was ordained in 1880. He was then Curate of St Mary's, Shrewsbury, and became successively Vicar of Alfreton in 1883 and Vicar of the Abbey Church, Shrewsbury in 1889. In 1899, he became Rector of Adel Church, Leeds, a position he retained for twenty-one years. During the First World War, he also acted as deputy for the Professor of English Literature at the University of Leeds, who was absent on war service. In 1918, Draper was appointed as a member of the council for the revision of the Anglican communion service.

In 1919, he became Master of the Temple in London. In 1930, contending that he had spent too long in one place, he left the Temple to become Vicar of Weare, retiring in 1933 shortly before his death.

Throughout his career, he contributed hymns to periodicals such as The Guardian and the Church Monthly. He also wrote a book of Poems of the Love of England, a biography of Sir Nathan Bodington, a survey of the University extension movement in 1923, and A Picture of Religion in England in 1927. He also developed a scheme for the establishment of church lectures in the universities.

He died in Clifton, Bristol on 9 August 1933.

== Personal life ==
Draper married Edith, daughter of the High Court judge and Liberal politician George Denman, in 1883. She died in 1884, shortly after childbirth. He then married Emilie Augusta FitzHerbert Wright in 1889, who died in 1913. In 1920, he took a third wife, Silvia Mary Richards, daughter of the Rev. G. C. Richards who was then Canon of Durham and Professor of Greek and Classical Literature in the University of Durham.

In addition to losing two wives, several of Draper's children predeceased him. One daughter, Angela Lucy, died of diphtheria in February 1903, and three of his sons died in the First World War. Another daughter married the notable musician Thomas Armstrong.

== Well-known hymns ==
- All Creatures of Our God and King
- Come Forth, Ye Sick and Poor
- From Homes of Quiet Peace
- How Blest the Land Where God Is Known
- How Fair Was the Land of God’s People of Old
- Hush, All Ye Sounds of War
- In Our Day of Thanksgiving
- Lord, Through This Holy Week of Our Salvation
- Man Shall Not Live by Bread Alone
- Rejoice, Ye Angels in the Sky
- Righteous Father, We Have Wronged Thee
- We Love God’s Acre Round the Church
- What Can I Do for England?
- Ye Sons of God, Arise

== Published hymnals ==
- The Victoria Book of Hymns (1897)
- Hymns for Holy Week (London: H. Frowde, 1898)
- A Memorial Service for Them That Are Fallen Asleep in Christ (London: H. Frowde, 1898)
- The Way of the Cross (Oxford: A. R. Mowbray & Co.)
