= Thomas Adams School =

The Thomas Adams School
- Thomas Adams School Crest

Location
- Lowe Hill; Wem, Shropshire, SY4 5UB; England
- 52.8589°N 2.7301°W

Information
- Former names: The Free School of Wem, Adams Grammar School Wem, Adams School Wem,
- Type: Comprehensive school Academy
- Religious affiliation: None
- Established: 1650; 376 years ago
- Founder: Sir Thomas Adams
- Department for Education URN: 147508 Tables
- Ofsted: Reports
- Chair of Governors: Stuart Mason
- Headteacher: Mark Cooper
- Staff: 110
- Gender: Coeducational
- Age: 11 to 18
- Houses: Clee, Lawley, Haughmond, Caradoc, Corndon, Hawkstone & Grinshill
- Colours: Blue, White
- Affiliations: Keele University; Drapers' Company of London
- Website: http://www.thomasadams.net

Thomas Adams School is a coeducational comprehensive secondary school school and sixth form in Wem, Shropshire, England. It is one of circa 30 UK state boarding schools. The school takes pupils from ages 11–18 and currently has just over 1,250 on roll. The school is located on a 30-acre site split across 2 campuses which are connected. The Lowe Hill site is the location of the secondary school (11-16) whilst the Noble Street site is the location for the sixth form and adjacent boarding houses. The boarding house can accommodate up to 65 students.

== History ==
The school was founded as a grammar school in 1650 by Sir Thomas Adams, the Lord Mayor of London for 1645, who was described by the diarist Samuel Pepys as a "comely old alderman". He was a Sheriff of London, Master of the Drapers' Company, and a Member of Parliament for the City of London. A staunch royalist, he was imprisoned in the Tower of London for his royalist sympathies, but in 1660 was sent by Parliament to the Hague to wait upon King Charles II, who was about to be restored to the throne. Adams paid for the Bible to be translated into Persian.

The Adams Grammar School merged with Wem Secondary Modern School in 1976 to form Adams School, later named Thomas Adams School.

In March 2020 the school joined The Priory Trust. The Priory Trust was renamed to the 3-18 Trust.

The school was rated (in 2014, 2017 and 2023) by Ofsted to be good. The boarding house was rated as good in 2023 by OFSTED The school has a strong connection with the Drapers Company, an ancient London guild who nominate two governors to sit on the school's governing body. The Drapers Company is well known for its educational connections and charitable contributions, it helps support a number of schools and universities which have historical links with the company.

== Notable staff ==
- Samuel Garbet, topographer and local historian of Wem, was second master at Wem Grammar School 1712-42, retiring after declining the school headship.

== Notable alumni ==
Although there is no active alumni association, over 1,600 ex-pupils of Wem Modern School, Adams School and Thomas Adams School are members of the Facebook group Adams School Wem Nostalgia Group.

Notable past-pupils of the Thomas Adams School include:

=== Adams Grammar School and Wem Modern School ===
- Peter Jones, actor
- Sandy Lyle, golfer
- Sir Henry Maddocks, lawyer/politician
- General Sir Charles Warren
- Sir John Bickerton Williams, lawyer, nonconformist historian

=== Thomas Adams School ===
- Greg Davies, comedian
- Paul Jones, footballer
- Neil Thomas, gymnast
