= Samuel Garbet =

English topographer

Samuel Garbet (d. 1751?) was an English topographer.

== Biography ==
Garbet was born in Norton, in the parish of Wroxeter, Shropshire. He was educated at Donnington School in Shropshire and at Christ Church, Oxford, where he entered 12 June 1700, and graduated with a B.A. 23 May 1704, and an M.A. 5 July 1707. He was ordained as a deacon 22 Sept. 1706, and became curate of Great Ness in Shropshire.

On 11 March 1712, he was elected second master of the free school at Wem, in Shropshire. In 1713, he became the curate of nearby Edstaston. In 1724 he was offered, but declined, the headmastership of the Wem school. In 1742, “having [by his own account] kept up the credit of the school for thirty years, and being in easy circumstances, he thought fit to retire,” and devoted himself to the compilation of his 'History of Wem, and the following Villages and Townships,’ which was published posthumously in 1818 (in Wem, octavo).

In 1715 he had published a translation of Phaedrus, books i. and ii. In 1751 he was still curate of Edstaston (History of Wem, p. 280), and his death may have taken place in or after that year.

== Personal ==
He married Anna, daughter of John Edwards of Great Ness, by whom he had one son, Samuel. He graduated at Christ Church, Oxford, B.A. 1737, M.A. 1743, became curate of Wem and afterwards of Newtown, Shropshire, and died in 1768. He was buried at Stoulton, near Worcester.

According to Gough (British Topography volume ii. 389) the younger Garbet had the principal hand in drawing up Valentine Green's 'Survey of the City of Worcester' (1764), and was 'a great historian, chronologist, and linguist,’ though he published nothing in his own name.
