= Great Ness =

Civil parish in Shropshire, England

Coordinates: 52.764°N 2.892°W

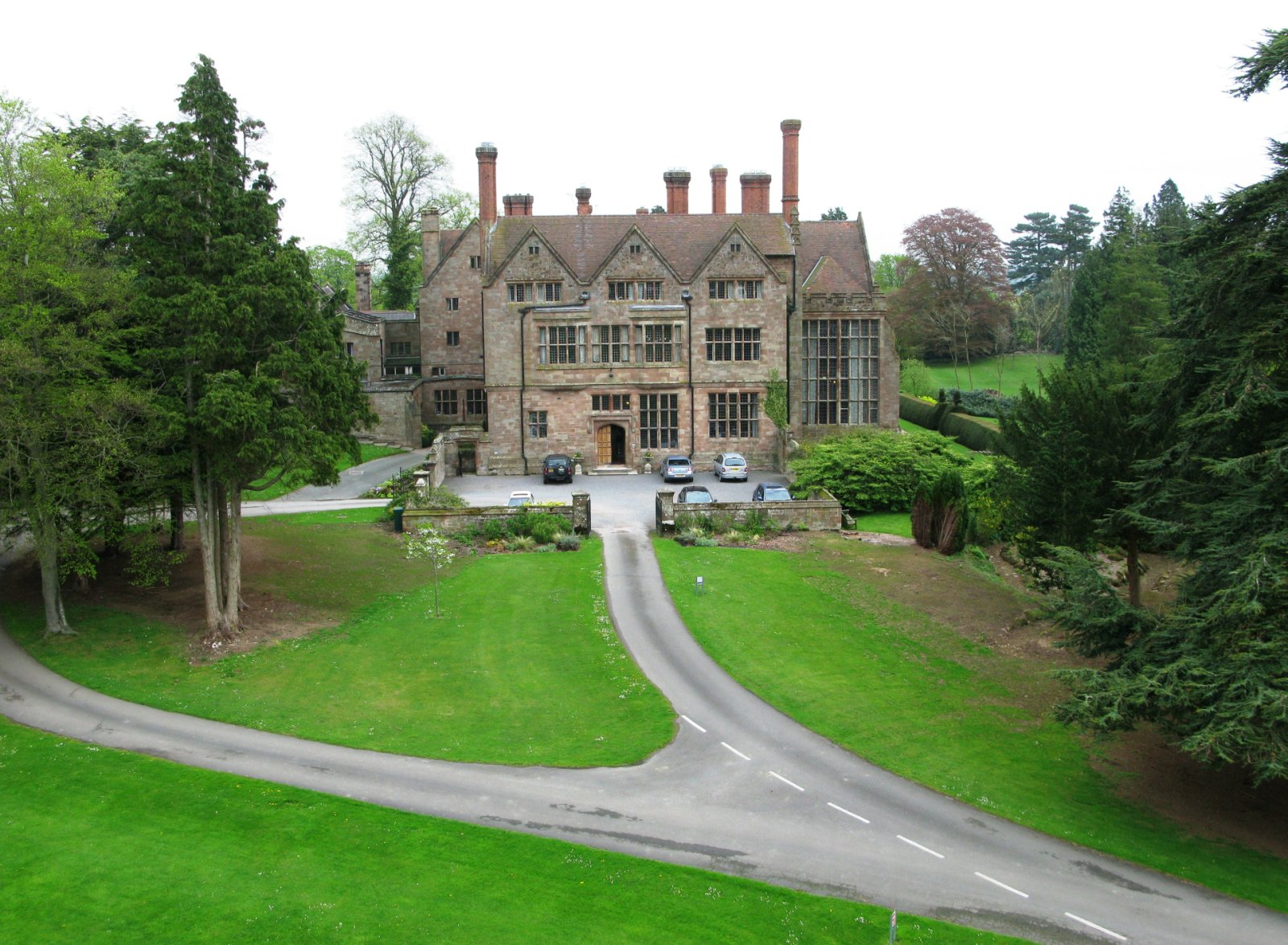
- Adcote School for Girls, in Little Ness

- Location within Shropshire
- Population: 879 (2011 census)
- OS grid reference: SJ398188
- Civil parish: Great Ness
- Unitary authority: Shropshire
- Ceremonial county: Shropshire
- Region: West Midlands
- Country: England
- Sovereign state: United Kingdom
- Post town: SHREWSBURY
- Postcode district: SY4
- Dialling code: 01743
- Police: West Mercia
- Fire: Shropshire
- Ambulance: West Midlands
- UK Parliament: Shrewsbury and Atcham

Great Ness is a village and civil parish in Shropshire, England.

== Common local governance ==
Great Ness shares a parish council with Little Ness called "Great Ness and Little Ness Parish Council". Great Ness parish covers the area surrounding the village of Nesscliffe, Hopton, Kinton, Willcot, Felton Butler and Alderton. Great Ness is represented on the unitary Shropshire Council, and in the Shrewsbury and Atcham Parliamentary constituency. The Great Ness and Little Ness Parish council meet on the first Tuesday of every month, except for January and August, at Nesscliffe Village Hall or Little Ness Village Hall.

== Great Ness - the village ==
Great Ness is compact and consists of various styles of dwellings, many of which have become listed buildings. In total there are 26 Listed buildings in Great Ness.

The Church of Saint Andrew, the Church of England parish church in Great Ness is protected by Grade I listing. It was mentioned in the Domesday Book as the "Manor of Nessham" due to it being one of the seven churches Roger de Montgomery, the first Norman Earl of Shrewsbury, retained in his own hands. The church is part of a benefice also including Little Ness and Ruyton-XI-Towns. Topographer Samuel Garbet was curate at Great Ness before becoming a school master at Wem in 1712.

In 2011 Great Ness became a conservation area.

=== History ===
Throughout time Great Ness has had a few changes in registration districts. In 1935 the Ellesmere district lost Great Ness to the Oswestry district and just over 30 years later, in 1967, Shrewsbury gained Great Ness and became its registration district. Coincidentally the only major boundary change that took place was in 1967 when it was reduced to aid the enlargement of another parish, Kinnerley.

=== Population ===
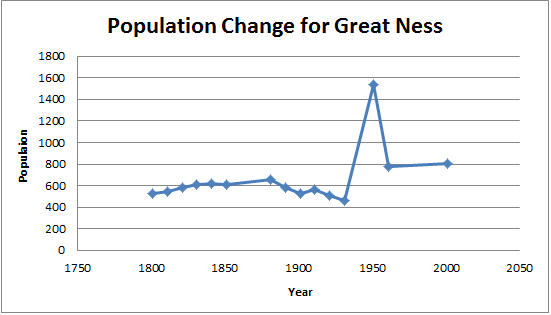
Population change in Great Ness from 1801 – 2001

Between 1881 and 2001 Shropshire has experienced a rapid population increase of 10.5% which is over twice as fast as the growth of England which is 4.8%. However the increase has not been due to natural growth but the migration of people into the area. Migration to the Shropshire area in 2001 was high with 13,613 migrants moving into the Shropshire area, North Shropshire showed the highest overall level of net inward migration. This most likely to be explained by the inward migration of 933 people into communal establishments in the area, the RAF Shawbury, the Tern Hill Barracks or HM Youth Custody Centre at Stoke Heath.

The population of Great Ness has generally followed trend and risen in population since the early 19th century, but did experience a few decades of decline from 1881 to 1931 where the population fell by 200 in the space of 50 years. However, in contrast to this Great Ness experienced rapid growth from 1931 to 1951 reaching an all-time high of 1536. The most recent count of Great Ness's population is from the 2001 census showing Great Ness to have a population of 807, increasing to 879 at the 2011 Census.

In general the early census reports were very simplified creating confusion with things such as the classifications of occupation, leading to issues like social status and what the individual workers did being mixed up. In the census report of 1881 more organised classifications were implicated covering over 414 categories. The graph below is made from the 1881 census report showing agriculture to be the most dominant occupation, accounting for over 50% of all males. Whereas the majority of women were found to be working in domestic services or offices.

Due to Great Ness lying to the north of the River Severn it receives fertile deposits which is how it resulted in settlement and agriculture. The river valley's crops indicate agricultural activity as far back as the Bronze Age. The majority of the area remains largely rural in character and sparsely populated.

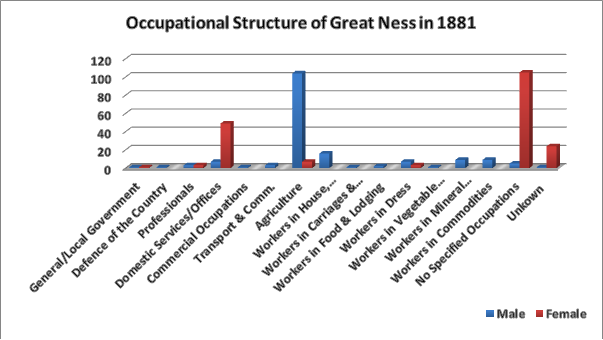
Population Structure of Great Ness 1881

== Attractions ==
Humphrey Kynaston, son of Sir Roger Kynaston a former High Sheriff of Shropshire, got his nickname 'Wild Humphrey Kynaston' from his lifestyle and frequently getting into trouble with the law. Consequently, his legendary deeds have become the basis for many attractions in the local area including Nesscliffe Country Park and Nesscliffe Rock Cave.

=== Nesscliffe Country Park ===
Nesscliffe Country park lies just off the A5 between Oswestry and Shrewsbury.

The Old Three Pigeons Inn, dated back to the 15th century, is located south of the entrance to the Park and was said to be the watering hole of Humphrey Kynaston. Inside, a seat from Kynaston's cave is now part of the Inn's fireplace.

The park itself is divided into three areas, from south to north: Nesscliffe Hill, Hopton Hill and The Cliffe (the latter a common land hill whose northern access footpaths begin at Ruyton-XI-Towns). Shruggs Common, believed to be the smallest common in Shropshire of approximately 1/4 acre, is found on Nesscliffe Hill.

=== Nesscliffe Rock Cave ===
The Nesscliffe Rock Cave is part of the Nesscliffe Country Park. It is a small sandstone cave and is better known as Kynaston's Cave as it is the place he and his steed Beelzebub sought refuge. The entrance to the cave is six metres high and stairs were cut into the soft rock, however over time the stairs have eroded. Inside the cave can be seen two chambers approximately four square metres big and the date 1564 carved into one of the walls, followed by the initials of H.K., reputedly of Humphrey Kynaston. A wooden staircase once existed to give access to the cave but was not extant as of 2015; today the steps have been fenced off and the mouth and window of the cave shut off by grids.
