= In Our Day of Thanksgiving =

1894 English hymn by William Henry Draper

- Christian hymn by William Henry Draper
- Genre: Hymn
- Written: 1894
- Meter: 13.12.13.11
- Melody: St Catherine's Court
- Published: 1897

In Our Day of Thanksgiving is a Christian hymn written in 1894 by the English hymnodist William Henry Draper. It was first published in The Victoria Book of Hymns in 1897, and appears in a number of current hymnbooks. The text of the hymn is about remembrance of the dead and is often sung on All Saints' Day or All Souls' Day, or for the dedication of a church.

== History ==
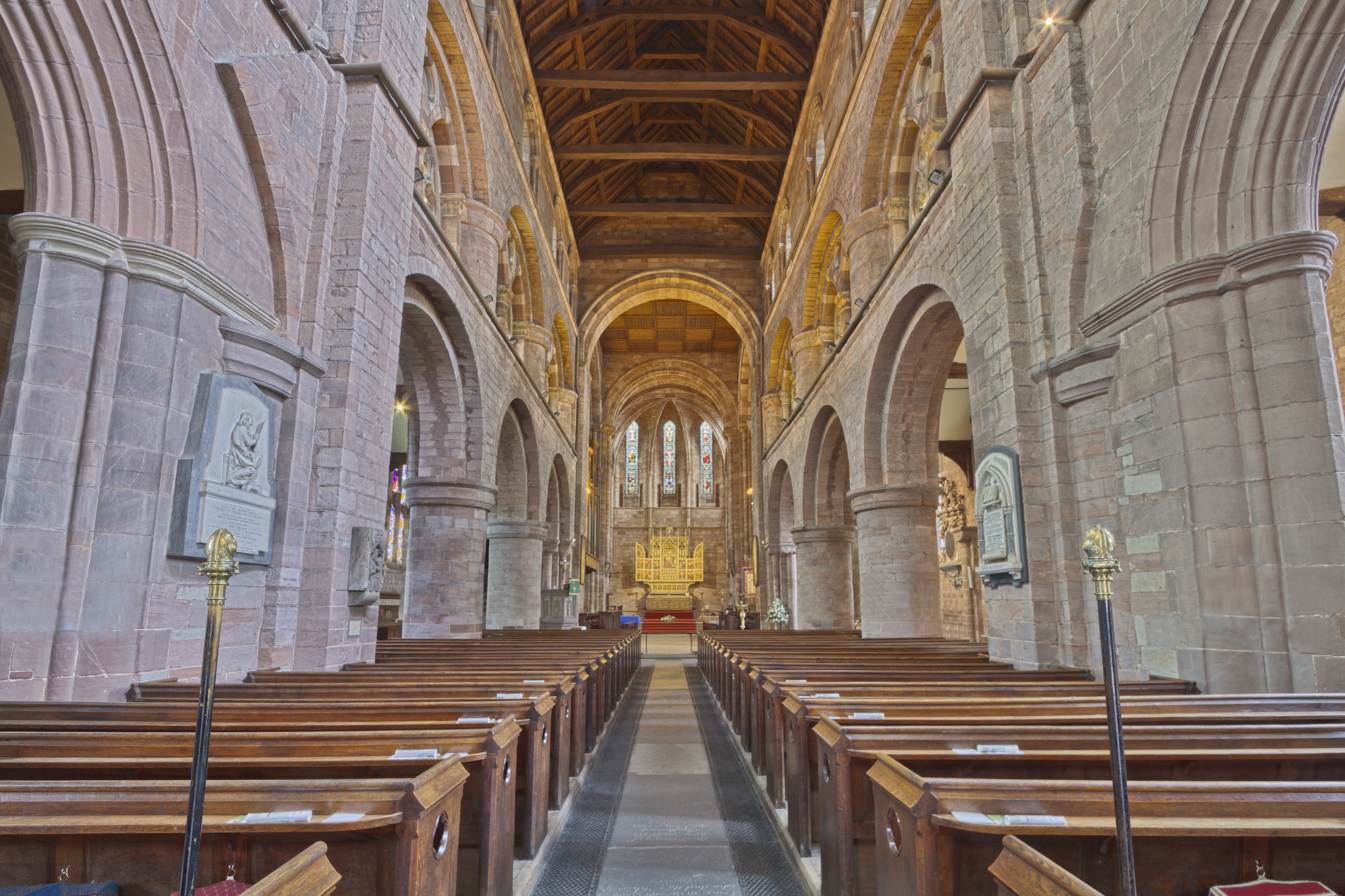
The hymn was written to mark the restoration of Shrewsbury Abbey in 1894

Draper was a Church of England clergyman. From 1889 to 1899 he served as vicar of the Abbey Church of the Holy Cross in Shrewsbury, Shropshire. During his incumbency there, the Abbey underwent restoration. Draper wrote the hymn "In Our Day of Thanksgiving" for the thanksgiving service marking the completion of the restoration in 1894. The hymn was titled "Remembrance of Past Worshippers" and distributed on a leaflet. After it was sung at the 1896 Church Congress in Shrewsbury, printed copies went on sale for 2d.

In 1897, Draper, along with John Varley Roberts, included it in the hymnbook, The Victoria Book of Hymns published in 1897 to celebrate the Diamond Jubilee of Queen Victoria. The hymn was included in the 1904 edition of the Anglican hymnal, Hymns Ancient and Modern.

The hymn appears in a number of current hymnals including The New English Hymnal (1986) Evangelical Lutheran Worship (2006), and Hymns and Psalms (1983).

== Text ==
The text of the hymn is concerned with giving thanks to God for the lives of Christians who have died and passed into the afterlife.

In our day of thanksgiving one psalm let us offer
for the saints who before us have found their reward;

The hymn also makes reference to earthly church buildings and their significance as a place of pilgrimage.

These stones that have echoed their praises are holy,
and dear is the ground where their feet have once trod;
yet here they confessed they were strangers and pilgrims,
and still they were seeking the city of God.

== Tune ==
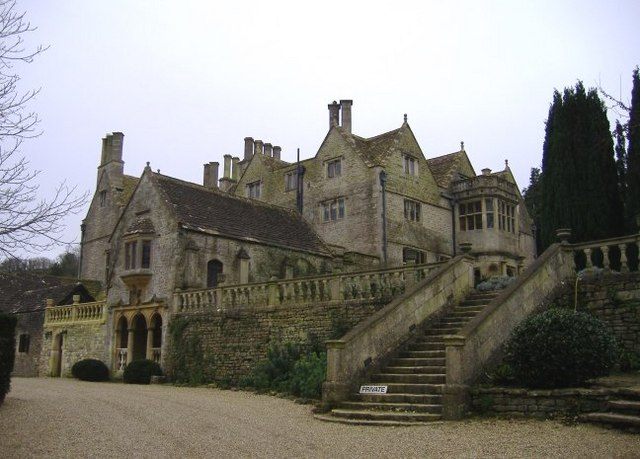
The Strutt family home, St Catherine's Court in Somerset

"In Our Day of Thanksgiving" has a metre of 13.12.13.11. When first published by Draper, it was originally set to a hymn tune entitled Victory, by Sir Joseph Barnby. In the 1904 edition of Hymns Ancient and Modern it was set to the hymn tune Montgomery, variously attributed to John Stanley or S. Jarvis. Other alternate tunes include Kremser, a 17th-century Dutch melody composed by Adrianus Valerius and arranged by Eduard Kremser; and a German tune, Was lebet was schwebet.

Today, the hymn is commonly sung to the tune St Catherine's Court. This tune was composed in 1925 by Richard Strutt for the golden jubilee in of the Girls' Friendly Society and published in their Jubilee Hymn Book. It was named the tune after Strutt's country house, St Catherine's Court. The hymn was published with this tune in the 1950 edition Hymns Ancient and Modern.
