= Myddle =

Village in Shropshire, England

Coordinates: 52.810°N 2.787°W

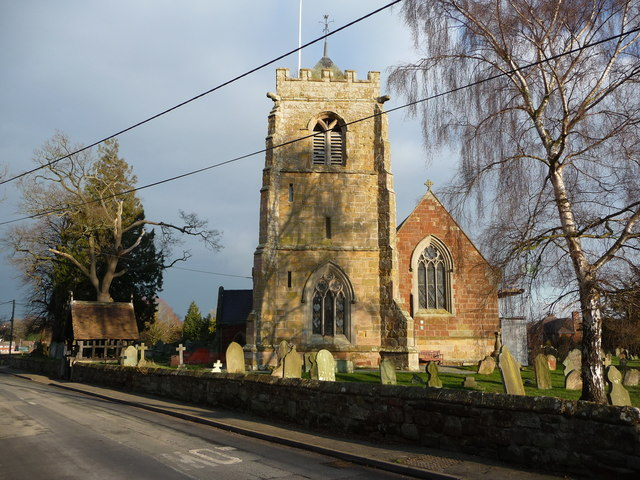
- St. Peter's parish church, Myddle

- Location within Shropshire
- Population: 1,333 (2011)
- OS grid reference: SJ469239
- Civil parish: Myddle, Broughton and Harmer Hill
- Unitary authority: Shropshire
- Ceremonial county: Shropshire
- Region: West Midlands
- Country: England
- Sovereign state: United Kingdom
- Post town: SHREWSBURY
- Postcode district: SY4
- Dialling code: 01939
- Police: West Mercia
- Fire: Shropshire
- Ambulance: West Midlands
- UK Parliament: North Shropshire

Myddle (also formerly known as Mydle, Middle, Midle, M'dle, Meadley and Medle) is a small village and former civil parish, now in the parish of Myddle, Broughton and Harmer Hill, in the Shropshire Council district, in the ceremonial county of Shropshire, England, about 10 miles north of Shrewsbury, the county town of Shropshire. In 1961 the parish had a population of 745.

In a book written about Myddle in 1700, the author, Richard Gough, describes the parish community and its doings, and his work has been used as a study of human relations. The book has been called "the greatest insight" into the "middle sort" of people in Early Modern England. Gough's book was published at London and Shrewsbury by Henry Sotheran & Co and Adnitt & Naunton in 1875. C. 1975 the Records Committee of Salop County Council published the book in facsimile and a paperback edition appeared in 1981. Human Nature Displayed in the History of Myddle: also known as "Antiquities and Memoirs of the Parish of Myddle, County of Salop" was a facsimile edition of the privately printed edition of 1834, published by Centaur Press in 1968.

== History ==
=== Medieval history ===
The village of Myddle was occupied by 1066, with a manor house for Siward, Earl of Northumbria completed in the 1050s.

By 1086, the year of the Domesday Book under William the Conqueror, the manor house was occupied by Rainald the Sheriff. During the 12th century, the Fitz Alan family of Clun occupied the manor house, with John Le Strange acquiring it around 1165.

In 1234, Myddle was the location of the signing of the treaty between King Henry III and Welsh Prince Llywelyn the Great, called The Peace of Middle.

In September 2005 and September 2007 a detectorist uncovered a small number of hammered gold coins dating back to the 14th century.

=== Modern history ===
The Le Strange dynasty ended in 1580 due to the lack of male heirs to the estate, and Myddle passed to Thomas Stanley, 1st Earl of Derby after he married Joan Le Strange. Their son, Thomas, became the second Earl of Derby.

Queen Elizabeth I granted Thomas Barnston a licence to sell land in Myddle in 1596, and in 1600 Sir Thomas Egerton purchased the village. Egerton's son was created by James I the first Earl of Bridgewater in 1617.

During the English Civil War in 1642, Charles I recruited 20 men from Myddle, of whom 13 were killed.

Myddle suffered an earthquake in 1688, but continued to expand throughout the coming centuries, with butchers' shops, taverns, fishmongers and masons inhabiting the village by about 1850.

In 1901 the village was graced by a visit of the All American Trumpeters who put on a free show to raise funds for a memorial to Queen Victoria.

The manor house was destroyed and sold to pay the death duties of the third Earl Brownlow in 1924.

In 1942, during the Second World War, an RAF Whitley bomber crashed in Myddle after taking off from nearby Sleap Airfield.

On 1 April 1988 the parish was abolished to form "Myddle & Broughton", part also went to Wem Rural.

== Myddle Castle ==
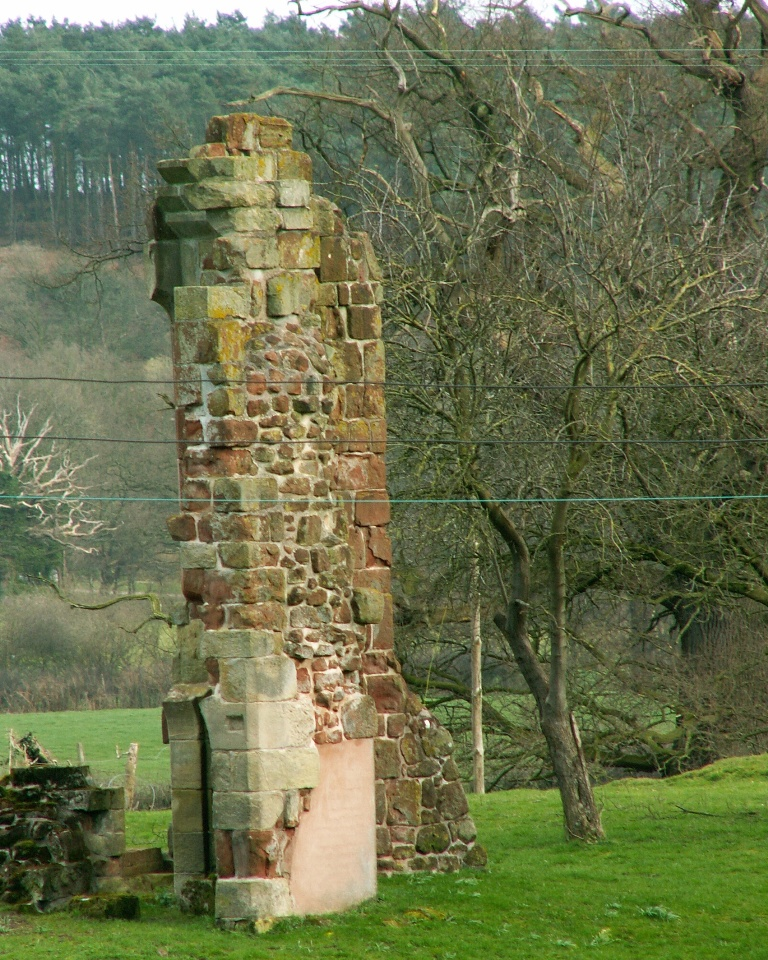
Myddle Castle ruins

A castle was constructed in Myddle between 1308 and 1310 by Lord John Le Strange as a stronghold against the Welsh after the family obtained a licence to convert the manor house into a castle.

Sometime around 1449, Elizabeth Cobham received the castle as part of her dowry from Richard, 7th Lord Strange. After Lord Strange died, Cobham married Sir Roger Kynaston in 1450. Elizabeth died in 1453 after bearing a son called Thomas, and left the castle to Kynaston. Upon Roger's death in 1495, his son Humphrey Kynaston inherited the castle, but allowed it to fall into disrepair, and abandoned it some time later.

The castle has stood empty since the 16th century, when one visitor to the village, John Leland, described the castle as veri ruinus (very ruinous) around 1540. The castle collapsed during the 1688 earthquake.

The castle was repaired by John Hume Egerton in 1849, who inscribed his name into a block in the castle's wall.

The castle is now a Grade II listed building and, since a portion collapsed in 1976, has been scheduled for repair.

== Notable residents ==
- Humphrey Kynaston, highwayman
- Richard Gough, author of Antiquities and Memoirs of the Parish of Myddle, was born in 1635 and died in 1723. He was educated in Myddle and Broughton and lived at Newton on the Hill. Gough had some knowledge of law and was well read in Latin literature; by his wife Joan (née Wood) he had 8 children of whom 4 still lived when he wrote his book in 1700-1702. He was usually referred to as a yeoman, or occasionally gentleman. To celebrate the 300th anniversary of Gough's account of village life, a group of 18 local people created an illustrated pack of six walks around Myddle which have become known as the "Gough Walks". W. G. Hoskins described the book as "one of the most entertaining ever written in English".
- William Gosling, footballer who played in gold medal-winning England team in 1900 Summer Olympics, owned and lived at Marton Hall near the village.
- Jas Mann, lead singer of Babylon Zoo
- Edward Stollins, co-founder of Our Price (chain of record shops, no longer in business)

== See also ==
- Listed buildings in Myddle and Broughton

== Sources ==
- G. Grazebrook and J. P. Rylands, The Visitation of Shropshire taken in the year 1623 (Harleian Visitations) Part 1 (London 1889). (Myddle family pedigrees).
- R. Gough, The History of Myddle; ed. with introduction and notes by David Hey). (Harmondsworth: Penguin, 1981) ISBN 0 14 00 5841 9 .
- D. Hey, An English Rural Community: Myddle under the Tudors and Stuarts (Leicester University Press, 1974).
