= Alderton, Shropshire =

Village in Shropshire, England

Coordinates: 52.809°N 2.750°W

Alderton
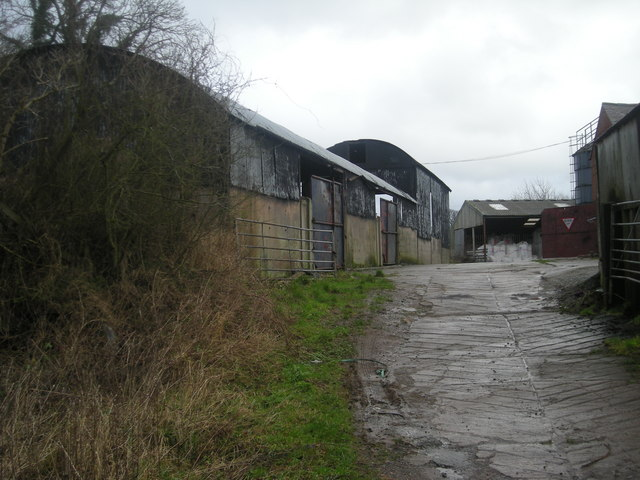
- Farm buildings at Alderton

- Location within Shropshire
- OS grid reference: SJ494237
- Civil parish: Myddle, Broughton and Harmer Hill
- Unitary authority: Shropshire
- Ceremonial county: Shropshire
- Region: West Midlands
- Country: England
- Sovereign state: United Kingdom
- Post town: SHREWSBURY
- Postcode district: SY4
- Dialling code: 01939
- Police: West Mercia
- Fire: Shropshire
- Ambulance: West Midlands
- UK Parliament: North Shropshire

Alderton is a village in the civil parish of Myddle, Broughton and Harmer Hill, in Shropshire, England.

== See also ==
- Listed buildings in Myddle and Broughton
