= Emstrey =

Hamlet in Shropshire, England

Coordinates: 52.689°N 2.701°W

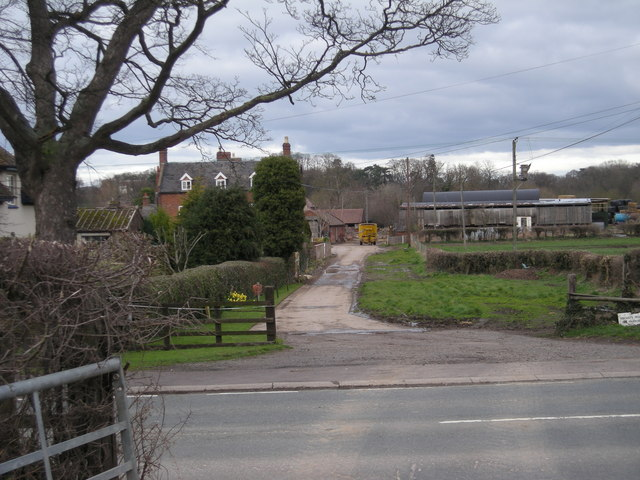
- Emstrey Farm

- Location within Shropshire
- OS grid reference: SJ526104
- Civil parish: Atcham
- Unitary authority: Shropshire
- Ceremonial county: Shropshire
- Region: West Midlands
- Country: England
- Sovereign state: United Kingdom
- Post town: SHREWSBURY
- Postcode district: SY5
- Dialling code: 01743
- Police: West Mercia
- Fire: Shropshire
- Ambulance: West Midlands
- UK Parliament: Shrewsbury and Atcham

Emstrey is a dispersed hamlet on the outskirts of Shrewsbury, in the English county of Shropshire. The hamlet is located south-east of the town, on the B4380 road to Atcham.

At the west end of the hamlet, on London Road, is the Emstrey Crematorium and Cemetery, now run by Dignity plc. The crematorium, originally built and owned by Shrewsbury Borough Council, was opened in 1958, the first such facility in Shropshire.

There is a large traffic island, Emstrey Roundabout, where the A5 Shrewsbury by-pass crosses with London Road (the A5064) into Shrewsbury, the Emstrey Bank road (the B4380) to Atcham and Ironbridge, and the former Shrewsbury bypass (also the B4380) towards Meole Brace.

Shrewsbury Business Park is located off Thieves Lane (the B4380). It contains a number of modern business units, predominantly professional firms such as lawyers and accountants.
