= Kinton, Shropshire =

Hamlet in Shropshire, England

Coordinates: 52.770°N 2.935°W

Kinton
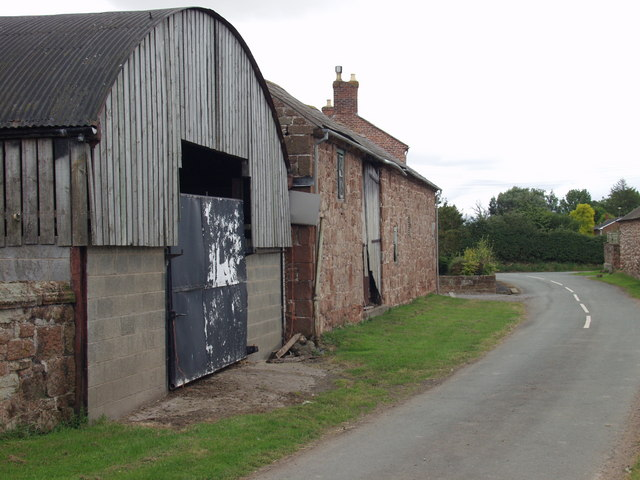
- Kinton Farm buildings

- Location within Shropshire
- OS grid reference: SJ369196
- Civil parish: Great Ness
- Unitary authority: Shropshire
- Ceremonial county: Shropshire
- Region: West Midlands
- Country: England
- Sovereign state: United Kingdom
- Post town: SHREWSBURY
- Postcode district: SY4
- Dialling code: 01743
- Police: West Mercia
- Fire: Shropshire
- Ambulance: West Midlands
- UK Parliament: Shrewsbury and Atcham

Kinton is a hamlet in Shropshire, England.

It is part of the civil parish of Great Ness, and is situated to the west of the A5 road.

Richard Mathews, the father of Oliver Mathews – the first historian of Shrewsbury – lived in Kinton.
