= Myddle, Broughton and Harmer Hill =

Civil parish in Shropshire, England

Coordinates: 52.811°N 2.788°W

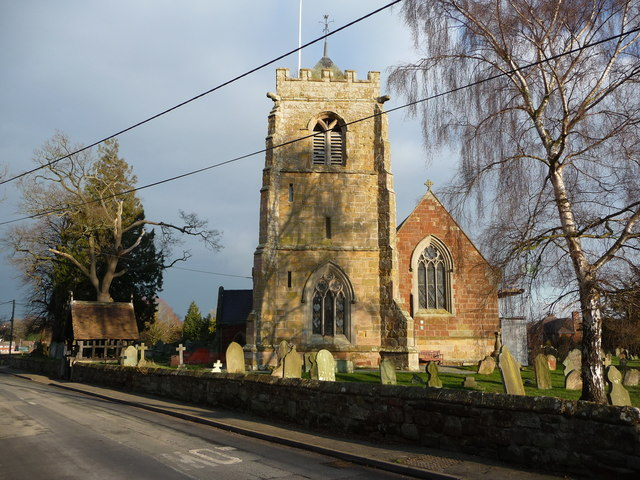
- St Peter's parish church, Myddle

- Location within Shropshire
- Population: 1,333 (2011 census)
- Civil parish: Myddle, Broughton and Harmer Hill
- Unitary authority: Shropshire
- Ceremonial county: Shropshire
- Region: West Midlands
- Country: England
- Sovereign state: United Kingdom
- Police: West Mercia
- Fire: Shropshire
- Ambulance: West Midlands

Myddle, Broughton and Harmer Hill is a civil parish in Shropshire, England. The population of this civil parish at the 2011 Census was 1,333.

The parish was created as the result of a merger of two older parishes - Myddle and Broughton. It was originally known as Myddle and Broughton, until it was renamed in 2015 to recognise the significance of the village of Harmer Hill, which together with Myddle is the other main population centre in the parish.
