= The Summer of the Danes =

1991 novel by Ellis Peters

- First edition
- Author: Ellis Peters
- Series: The Cadfael Chronicles
- Genre: Mystery novel
- Publisher: Headline
- Publication date: 1991
- Media type: Print (Hardcover, Paperback) & audio book
- Pages: 280
- ISBN: 0-7472-0333-4
- OCLC: 23254850
- Preceded by: The Potter's Field
- Followed by: The Holy Thief

The Summer of the Danes is a medieval mystery novel by Ellis Peters, set in 1144. It is the eighteenth in the Cadfael Chronicles and was first published in 1991.

Brother Cadfael is pleased to join his young friend Mark, now a deacon, on a mission of church diplomacy in Wales. Travelling in the safety of the Prince of Gwynedd's train, they are brought to unexpected dangers, as they seek to keep a young Welsh woman free from harm.

== Introduction to plot ==
The Anarchy is paused, except for the continued ravages of Geoffrey de Mandeville and his band of marauders in the Fens. Wales has a squabble between two brother princes, rooted in a murder the previous year. The Roman church under Theobald, the Archbishop of Canterbury, is extending its influence into Wales, which prefers its Celtic ways and the see of Saint David, by reviving an old bishopric straddling the border of England and Wales. Theobald requested that Bishop Roger de Clinton send a welcoming embassy to the new bishop, whose see includes parishes that once were under de Clinton.

== Plot summary ==
Three plots interlock in this novel. First is the embassy of Deacon Mark and Brother Cadfael to two bishops in Wales, reinforcing the Roman rite in Wales. Second is the young woman Heledd rejected by her canon father in reaction to imposition of the Roman rite, sending her to find love among historic Welsh enemies. Third is the trouble raised up by Cadwaladr, and resolved by Owain, who wanted no trouble with the Danes in their dragon boats.

Mark, a young deacon in the house of Roger de Clinton, Bishop of Lichfield and Coventry, is chosen to carry messages of good will to two bishops in Wales. He takes Brother Cadfael as translator into his homeland of north Wales in April 1144. They travel on horseback from Shrewsbury Abbey. Mark succeeds with the new bishop of Saint Asaph and the bishop of Bangor, sharing gifts and speaking as a diplomat. From Llanelwy to Bangor, they travel in the train of Owain Gwynedd, stopping at his royal seat at Aber overnight, where Cadfael finds a murdered man. Heledd rides away from Aber, not wanting to marry a man she has not chosen, awaiting her in Bangor.

Mark and Cadfael seek the lost Heledd as they head home. Cadfael finds her; as quickly as he does, the two are seized by a group of strong Danes led by Turcaill. They are prisoners in the camp of Otir, leader of the Danes of Dublin. Mark sees them and reports it to Owain. Heledd tells Cadfael she left Aber on a whim, finding the horse saddled and ready.

In a scheme to regain his lands and his good standing with his brother, Cadwaladr makes a deal with the Danes in Dublin to threaten Gwynedd. For Otir it is a cash transaction. The deal is for 2,000 marks in silver, cattle or goods. Otir's men are armed, but they have no plan to take on Owain's army. The ships land at Abermenai, opposite the island of Anglesey, at the end of the Menai Strait. Owain moves quickly to set up camp less than a mile away overnight. His brother approaches him with his scheme. Owain rejects it outright, telling his brother he must make good his debt to the Danes and keep the three captives safe. Cadwaladr instead tells the Danes that they should leave Gwynedd. Owain visits Otir to state his perspective on this awkward and potentially explosive situation. Cadwaladr will pay the amount he agreed, and the Danes will leave quietly.

Mark is the go-between to announce Owain's coming; he is left in place of Cadwaladr while the brothers talk in Owain's camp. Heledd relaxes in this break from her troubles by talking and teasing with Turcaill. Her unknown betrothed arrives at Owain's camp. Ieuan ap Ifor cannot wait; he plans a rescue in the night. Cadwaladr's supporters itch to release him so they join up with Ieuan. Upon hearing Owain's terms, Turcaill kidnaps Cadwaladr from Owain's camp in the night, so Otir can pressure Cadwaladr to gather his money and cattle to settle this affair.

Again Mark is the envoy, carrying Cadwaladr's words and seal to Owain, whom Cadwaladr trusts to gather his resources from his steward and bring them hence. Owain's son Hywel leads the party amassing the payment, Gwion riding out with them. The silver is loaded in barrels onto the Danish boats.

That night, Ieuan succeeds in seizing Heledd. Gwion, returned on his own with supporters of Cadwaladr, does not succeed in freeing him, but sparks a battle, which kills three of the Danes, and some of his own men. Owain arrives after dawn, with the drove of cattle finishing Cadwaladr's debt, seeing the Danes in full battle array. Gwion takes the moment to charge his own men again. Owain orders his men to stop. There are more casualties. Gwion takes a fatal wound from Otir. In the presence of Cadfael and Owain, Gwion confesses to the murder at Aber. His compatriot Bledri would not ride to Cadwaladr that night. The horse was gone. Cadwaladr received no intelligence, so the murder gained him nothing. His death is rough justice for the murder Gwion committed at Aber. Heledd accepts her capture by Ieuan equably. She approaches what had been Otir's camp. At sunset, Turcaill arrives in a boat. She leaves with the man of her choice, leaving behind her troubles with her father.

Mark and Cadfael proceed to Shrewsbury Abbey. They stay at Hugh's manor in Maesbury overnight for a pleasant family visit, with Aline and young Giles to cheer them. They overstayed the ten days promised to Abbot Radulfus, and Cadfael is happy to go home.

== Characters ==
- Brother Cadfael: Herbalist monk and sometime sleuth at Shrewsbury Abbey, born in Wales. He is aged about 64 in this story. In dialogue with Mark or Cuhelyn he tells his own Welsh heritage and his decisions in youth to leave Wales when he was offered the chance to travel to Shrewsbury at the age of 14. His life has now travelled a full circle; he is pleased to be tied to a small piece of land and a small fraternity of brother monks.
- Abbot Radulfus: Head of the Benedictine Abbey of Saint Peter and Saint Paul, based on the real abbot of the era. He released Cadfael to aid Mark.
- Hugh Beringar: Sheriff of Shropshire, appointed by King Stephen. He owns manors at Maesbury, near the border with north Wales. From both his home location and his agreements as Sheriff with Owain and other neighbouring rulers, he advises Mark on his best route, and some delicate points in present politics. Introduced in One Corpse Too Many.
- Deacon Mark: Deacon with Bishop Roger de Clinton sent on embassy to two parishes in Wales. As a young monk, he spent two years with Cadfael, where they became great friends. He has a talent for reading people's true natures and true needs. His priestly studies are financed by Leoric Aspley (see The Devil's Novice). About 23 years old. Officially introduced in Monk's Hood, but he may have been unofficially mentioned at the very end of A Morbid Taste for Bones.
- Bishop Gilbert: He is newly appointed by Theobald, Archbishop of Canterbury to head the revived diocese of Saint Asaph at Llanelwy, its parishes straddling the boundary of Wales and England, and formerly in the see of Bishop Roger de Clinton. A man of Norman birth, he speaks no Welsh. Real historical bishop.
- Bishop Meurig: Welsh bishop of Bangor. He swore allegiance to King Stephen, accepted Canterbury as the only Archbishop four years earlier. He is a pleasant and practical man. Real historical bishop.
- Owain Gwynedd: Prince of Gwynedd. He is a real historical person, who is in his early forties in this story. He is attempting to unite the independent parts of Wales through dynastic marriages and strategic alliances. He was mightily displeased with his brother Cadwaladr for directing the murder of the Prince of Deheubarth, who was betrothed to Owain's daughter, and dispossessed Cadwaladr of his lands. This prince makes his second appearance as a character in this series of novels.
- Hywel ab Owain: Second son of Owain, who drove Cadwaladr out of his lands on his father's order. Also a poet. He is about 20 years old. Real historical person.
- Rhun ab Owain: Eldest son of Owain. He has his father's appearance, is the pattern of a prince since age 16, and his father's favourite. Real historical person.
- Cadwaladr: A younger brother of Owain. He was dispossessed of his lands in north Ceredigion in Wales by Owain for his role in killing Prince Anarawd of Deheubarth. He escaped to Ireland in disgrace. He is a strong man, with an impetuous temper. He is a real historical person who made such troubles in history.
- Anarawd ap Gruffydd: Prince of Deheubarth in southern Wales. He was an ally to Owain Gwynedd and betrothed to his daughter; then slain by Cadwaladr's men in the year before the story started. His death is the reason for Owain stripping Cadwaladr's lands from him. Real historical person.
- Canon Meirion: Canon of the new see at Saint Asaph, under Bishop Gilbert. He was a married priest who is now widowed, father of Heledd. He is balancing his career against his daughter, under the new rules. The depth of his feelings for her shows itself when she runs away.
- Heledd: Bold, observant, beautiful dark-haired daughter of Meirion. She is betrothed to a man she has never met, feeling unloved by her father. Her mother died the prior Christmas, an event awaited by the Bishop Gilbert. She is 17 or 18 years old. Wales kept married priests, but the Roman rite so recently imposed disallows them. The new bishop finds her a bad sign of old sinful ways.
- Canon Morgant: Another canon under Bishop Gilbert. He is sent with the party bringing Heledd to meet her betrothed in Bangor.
- Cuhelyn ab Einion: Warrior seriously injured in serving Prince Anarawd the prior year. He lost his left hand in that encounter. He is now in the household of Owain Gwynedd. Mark notices the resemblance between Cuhelyn and Gwion, in looks and passion, though mirror images in Cadfael's view. At the meal with Bishop Gilbert, Cuhelyn recognises Bledri ap Rhys as one of the eight in the party who attacked him and Prince Anarawd.
- Bledri ap Rhys: Man in Cadwaladr's service. He was of the group who murdered Prince Anarawd. He is an unexpected envoy at a meal at Saint Asaph at Llanelwy to all but the new bishop, who wants Owain to reconcile with his brother. He travels with the party leaving Llanelwy the next day. He was found murdered the next morning at Aber.
- Gwion: Young man at Aber on his parole for the last six months. Hostage from among the lesser chiefs of Cadwaladr, fiercely loyal to him, and unwilling to "promise peace" to Hywel. He and Bledri ap Rhys are of the same allegiance. He is seen speaking with Bledri in the chapel after the feast.
- Ieuan ab Ifor: Betrothed chosen for Heledd by Owain. He is present with Owain's army at Carnarvon; of Anglesey. He is in his mid-thirties, grey already salting his dark hair, of muscular build.
- Turcaill son of Turcaill: One of the Danes from Dublin aligned with Cadwaladr. He seized Heledd and Cadfael. He is a tall, strong, flaxen-haired young man.
- Leif: Son of a Welsh mother and Danish father, who speaks Welsh like a native. At 15 years old, he spies among the Welsh for Turcaill.
- Otir: Leader of the Danes of Dublin. He is allied with Cadwaladr in his fight to regain his lands in Wales from his brother Owain. This is a transaction for money gain, rather than a political alliance for Otir. Real historical person.

== Continuity ==
Deacon Mark was first introduced by name in Monk's Hood as the assistant to Cadfael at the end of 1138. Cadfael has much respect for Mark, and is delighted he received a gift for his education to become a priest in The Devil's Novice two years later, a gift from the lord of a local manor whose son was helped by Brother Mark. In several later novels, Cadfael speaks of how he will wait to confess what he thinks his worst sins to Mark, when he is a priest, as Mark understands him so well. Serving Mark as a translator suits Cadfael well now, his favourite helper progressing so well on his way to priesthood.

The connection between Wales and England in this time comes to the fore in this novel, but is always in the background in the other novels. Having Owain Gwynedd as a character again (earlier in A Morbid Taste for Bones and a major character in Dead Man's Ransom) lets the reader see how close the people are on either side of changing border, and as well the differences.

== Setting in history ==
=== Political events in the Church and within Wales ===
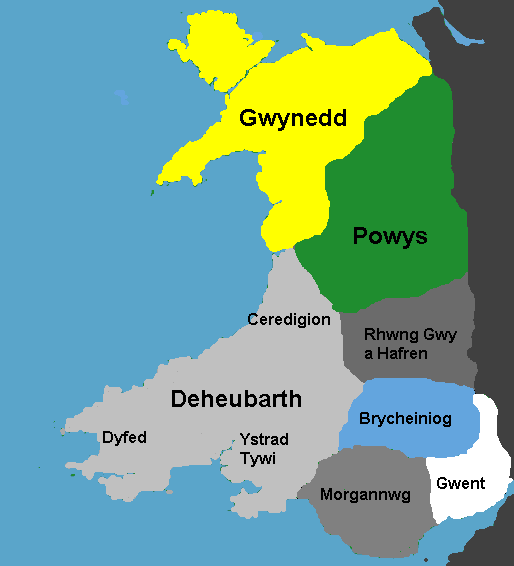
Wales in the 12th Century – Isle of Anglesey at top

Unlike most of the Brother Cadfael chronicles, the Summer of the Danes is set in north Wales, specifically Gwynedd. Wales was then divided into many principalities. Owain Gwynedd tried to unite many of them through negotiation, dynastic marriage and conquest. Historically, he and his brother Cadwaladr were several times estranged and reconciled. Cadwaladr did indeed enlist the help of a Danish fleet from Dublin to regain his lands. This conflict with Owain Gwynedd is a major thread of the plot of the novel.

Their encounter was at Abermenai Point, opposite the southwest corner of the Isle of Anglesey; Cadwaladr came with a group of Danes from Dublin in his hope of again being in his brother's good graces and perhaps regaining his lost lands in the north of Ceredigion just south of the border with Gwynedd.

After the instance in this novel, Danes from Dublin acted in Welsh affairs, specifically after Owain's death in 1170, on behalf of his dispossessed son Hywel. Prior to that, in the Great Revolt of 1166, Danes from Dublin were hired by Henry II of England to harass the coast while his armies fought the Welsh on land. They were ineffective, and Henry II lost on land as well.

Another driving force of the story is the tension within the Church, represented at the time by Theobald, the Archbishop of Canterbury, and churchmen in Wales who wished to preserve independent Celtic organisation and forms of their Christian religion. Among others, the Celtic Christian tradition allowed priests to be married and have children, while the Roman practice was newly enforcing celibacy among all priests. The See of St Asaph was reestablished the year before the story; Theobald appointed a Norman to impose the doctrines of Rome. Deacon Mark alludes to the Claim of Metropolitan Status of the See of St Davids, which would make it equal to Canterbury. This was opposed by Theobald. He moved to impose the Roman rite on all of Wales by 1148. This change at St Asaph attracts Deacon Mark and Brother Cadfael into Gwynedd and pushes Heledd out of it.

=== Places in the novel ===
The places named in the novel are real places, from Shrewsbury Abbey and Oswestry to St Asaph, Aber, Bangor, Abermenai and the many stops between Cadfael's home at the Abbey and his homeland of North Wales. Hugh Beringar's manor at Maesbury is said to be between the two great dykes built by Mercian kings to mark the border of their territory with Powys in the 8th century; the westernmost being the larger, known as Offa's dyke.

The Menai Strait makes Anglesey an island. Much of the action of the novel takes place along it. Bangor is adjacent to it on the mainland of Wales at its eastern end. Mark and Cadfael walk west along it in search of Heledd; Turcaill brings his boat down it seeking food for the men; and Owain brings his troops so quickly overnight from Carnarvon to the west end of the Menai Strait where the confrontation with his brother and the Danes from Dublin occurs, at Abermenai.

=== Customs and language in Wales ===
Welsh names for people and places are used in this novel, in keeping with it being a historical novel. Some naming customs are common, as the use of "son of" or "daughter of" in a name. Hywel ab Owain is Hywel son of Owain; similar to Bledri ap Rhys. Ab is used when the name following starts with a vowel, while ap is used when the name following begins with a consonant. Daughter of was not used in this novel; "merch" (rather than verch or ferch) has appeared in other of the novels in the series (see Peters, Ellis Dead Man's Ransom 1984).

A full guide to Welsh orthography is not needed for the names in this novel. A few hints make it easier. C is sounded as "hard" c, like k, as in the name Cuhelyn (kee hell in). (Note: Reader and British actor Stephen Thorne says the name Cuhelyn as 'koo hell in') Double "dd" is similar to a heavily stressed English "th" as in "this", as in Gwynedd (gwin eth) or Heledd (hell eth). Y is a vowel, either unstressed as in Hywel ab Owain (hah well ab oh wine) or Ynys (inn is), or sounding like ee as in Bledri ap Rhys (bled ree ap reese) or Llanelwy (lan ell wee). G is the hard sound, as the place name Ceredigion (kare uh dig ee on). TH is sounded similarly to English 'think' or 'three', as in Deheubarth (de hay barth) the southern principality in the 12th century.

Words of more than one syllable generally have even stress on all the syllables (unlike spoken English). A quick review of sounds with audio samples gives clear examples, including some of the names used in this book. A site about Welsh mountain names offers a quick guide to pronunciation. The sound represented by ll or Ll is a voiceless lateral fricative, which does not exist in English.

Hospitality was a major obligation to the Welsh in the 12th century. A contemporary author Gerald of Wales wrote of their ways in Latin, later translated to English. One feature of this novel is the supper feast at Aber hosted by Owain Gwynedd, explicating the customs there by courses, by conversations and by placement at table. The pattern of meals and the food served differed from that in the monastery. The courtesy due a guest in his house guided some of Owain's rapid decisions when the murdered man is found after the feast.

== Reviews ==
Kirkus Reviews finds this story heavy going, in contrast to earlier stories in the Cadfael series.

Library Journal reviewing an audio version finds Cadfael's role in this story different from prior novels in the series.

More recently written reviews give this book higher marks. They enjoy how Peters brings to life the historical princes and daily life of a feast or a moving camp. Billy J Hobbs claimed this was his favourite in the series, as it brings up well Cadfael's past as a soldier, and there is suspense in whether the Danes will invade.

== Publication history ==
Four hardback editions in English are listed at Fantastic Fiction. The first in April 1991. The most recent was in September 1993 by Ulverscroft Large Print Books Ltd ISBN 0-7089-2941-9 / ISBN 978-0-7089-2941-4 (UK edition). Five paperback editions, beginning in 1991, are published. The most recent was in November 1992 by Mysterious Press ISBN 0-446-40018-1 / ISBN 978-0-446-40018-3 (USA edition). The WorldCat collection includes two later editions: by Sphere, London in 2008, 282 pages ISBN 978-0-7515-1118-5, ISBN 0-7515-1118-8; and by Warner, London 2010, ©1991, 288 pages, map, illustrations, ISBN 978-0-7515-1118-5, ISBN 0-7515-1118-8.

Six audio editions were released. The first was in April 1994, read by Sir Derek Jacobi, by HarperCollins ISBN 0-00-104773-6 / ISBN 978-0-00-104773-0 (UK edition). The most recent was in February 2002 by Clipper Audio ISBN 1-4025-1571-5 / ISBN 978-1-4025-1571-2 (USA edition).

The novel was translated and published in French, Italian, German, and Dutch.

- French:
  - L'été des danois (Frère Cadfael, #18), Published 2001 by 10/18 Mass Market Paperback ISBN 978-2-264-03343-7
  - L'été des danois, Published 1993 by UGE, 351 pages ISBN 978-2-264-01948-6
- Italian: Il Monaco Prigioniero [The Prisoner Monk] (Hardcover), Published February 2002 by Longanesi, 227 pages ISBN 978-88-304-1936-0
- German: Bruder Cadfael und die schwarze Keltin [Brother Cadfael and the Black Celtish Woman] (Paperback), Published 1996 by Heyne, 282 pages, David Eisermann (Translator) ISBN 978-3-453-10817-2
- Dutch: Een lieve lust [A Real Delight] (Paperback), Published 1996 by De Boekerij, 237 pages, Pieter Janssens (Translator) ISBN 978-90-225-1409-2

Editions in Spanish and Korean are found in the holdings of WorldCat.

- Spanish: El verano de los daneses, María Antonia Menini (Translator), Publisher Barcelona Grijalbo 1993 ISBN 84-253-2550-1, ISBN 978-84-253-2550-2
- Korean: 반란의여름 : 엘리스피터스장편소설 /Pallan ŭi yŏrŭm: Ellisŭ P'it'ŏsŭ changp'yŏn sosŏl, Publisher 북하우스, Sŏul-si Buk Hausŭ, 2002 ISBN 89-5605-006-6, ISBN 978-89-5605-006-5
