= The Cadfael Chronicles =

Murder mystery series

The Cadfael Chronicles is a series of historical murder mysteries written by the English author Edith Pargeter (1913–1995) under the name Ellis Peters. Set in the 12th century in England during the Anarchy, the novels focus on a Welsh Benedictine monk, Cadfael, who aids the law by investigating and solving murders.

In all, Pargeter wrote twenty Cadfael novels between 1977 and 1994, plus one book of short stories. Each draws on the storyline, characters and developments of the previous books in the series. Pargeter planned the 20th novel, Brother Cadfael's Penance, as the final book of the series, and it brings together the loose story ends into a tidy conclusion. Pargeter herself died shortly after its publication, following a long illness. Many of the books have been adapted as radio episodes, in which Ray Smith, Glyn Houston and subsequently Philip Madoc played the titular character. An ITV television series was also developed from the books, which starred Derek Jacobi as Cadfael.

Pargeter's Cadfael Chronicles have been credited for popularizing the genre of historical mystery novels.

== Brother Cadfael ==
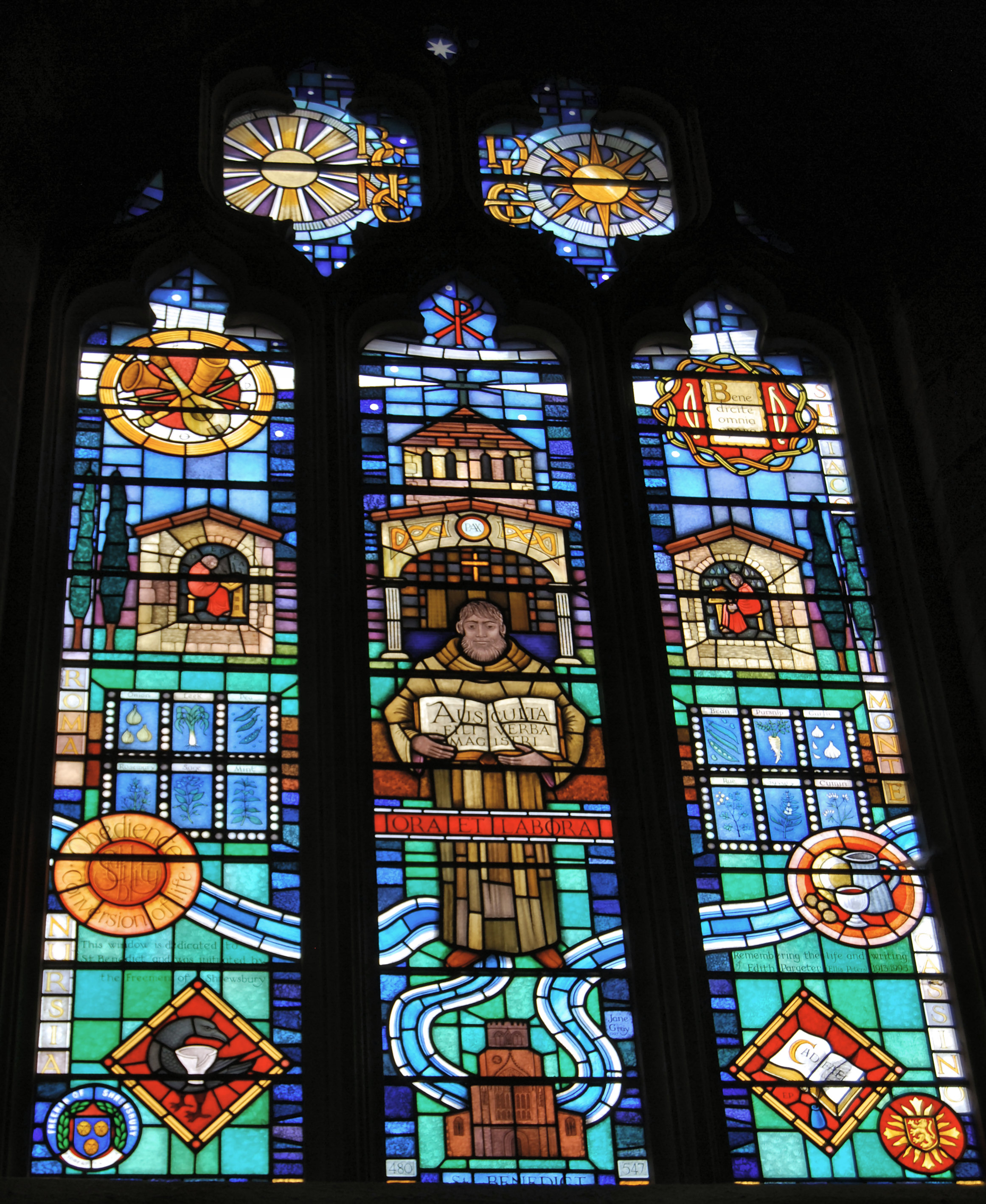
Cadfael window, Shrewsbury Abbey

Unlike his fellow monks, who took their vows as youths (and some as children), Cadfael is a conversus who entered the cloister in his forties after being a well-travelled crusader and sea captain. His experiences give him an array of talents and skills useful in monastic life and in his frequent role as investigator. He is a skilled observer of human nature and a talented herbalist, a skill he learned from Muslims in the Holy Land. He is inquisitive and energetic, and has an innate though obviously modern sense of justice and fair play. Abbots call upon him as a medical examiner, detective, doctor and diplomat. His worldly knowledge, although useful, gets him into trouble with the more doctrinaire characters of the series, and the seeming contradiction between the secular and the spiritual worlds forms a central and continuing theme.

== Historical background ==
The stories are set between 1137 and 1145, during the Anarchy, the destructive contest for the crown of England between King Stephen and Empress Matilda (also known as Empress Maud). Many historical events are described or referred to in the books. For example, the translation of Saint Winifred to Shrewsbury Abbey is fictionalised in the first chronicle, A Morbid Taste for Bones, and One Corpse Too Many is inspired by the siege of Shrewsbury Castle by Stephen in 1138. The burning of Worcester puts the characters on the run into the countryside around the town in The Virgin in the Ice. The pillage of Winchester and the burning of the abbey there sends the monks who are at the centre of the story to Shrewsbury Abbey in An Excellent Mystery. In Dead Man's Ransom the fictional characters are involved with the small group of Welshmen who take part in the Battle of Lincoln, drawing the historical prince of Gwynedd, Owain, into the plot. Empress Matilda's brief stay in London, when she tried to gain approval for her coronation while she held Stephen in prison, is the starting point for one character in The Pilgrim of Hate. The next turning of Henry of Blois's coat and the rising fortunes of King Stephen involve the Abbot and send three new people into the Foregate and the Abbey in The Raven in the Foregate. One main character in The Hermit of Eyton Forest arrives in Shropshire while the Empress is besieged in Oxford Castle. In The Potter's Field Hugh Beringar's force is called to the Fens to aid King Stephen in controlling the rampaging Geoffrey de Mandeville, Earl of Essex; on return the Sheriff doublechecks the story of a character who escaped from that area back to Shropshire. The quarrel between Owain Gwynedd and his impetuous younger brother Cadwaladr on account of Cadwaladr's murder of the prince of a southern principality in Wales, combined with the push to spread the Roman rite into Wales, are parts of the story told in The Summer of the Danes.

In novels where the plot does not hinge on a historical event or have historical characters in the story, the focus is on aspects of life in medieval England. Examples include the importance of pilgrimage in The Heretic's Apprentice, the wool and clothmaking trades in The Rose Rent, the rules of inheritance under Welsh law in Monk's Hood, and specific merchant trades in Saint Peter's Fair and The Sanctuary Sparrow. The annual fair raised funds for the Abbey, authorised by Earl Roger or King Henry I. The use of a house of worship for sanctuary from secular law is also a feature of The Sanctuary Sparrow. Cadfael is an herbalist, whose skills and potions bring him into contact with people outside the monastery, integral in the plots that are not dependent on a historical event.

The real people portrayed in the series include:

- King Stephen
- Empress Matilda (whom Peters usually calls Empress Maud)
- Robert of Gloucester and his son Philip
- Geoffrey de Mandeville, 1st Earl of Essex
- Robert of Leicester
- Owain Gwynedd, his brother Cadwaladr ap Gruffydd, and his son Hywel
- William of Ypres
- Bishop Henry of Blois
- Bishop Roger de Clinton
- Abbots Heribert (1128–1138), Radolfus (1138–1148) and Robert Pennant (prior to 1148, then abbot to 1168)
- Henry I of England (1068/9–1135)

== Bibliography ==
=== Cadfael novels ===
These are numbered in order of the time in which the novel was set, which, with one exception, is also the order of publication. Each book has been published in hardback and paperback, and in a number of languages. The first publication in the UK, by Macmillan (or Headline Book Publishing, beginning with The Hermit of Eyton Forest), is the year of first publication.

A Rare Benedictine is in the order of setting, but not in the order of publication. That book includes three short stories. The first describes how Cadfael, man-at-arms in the Crusades and Normandy, joined a Benedictine monastery in 1120. The other two short stories are set at later dates after he has been a monk for years.

1. A Rare Benedictine: The Advent of Brother Cadfael (September 1988, set in 1120 and later dates)
2. A Morbid Taste for Bones (published in August 1977, set in 1137)
3. One Corpse Too Many (July 1979, set in August 1138)
4. Monk's-Hood (August 1980, set in December 1138)
5. Saint Peter's Fair (May 1981, set in July 1139)
6. The Leper of Saint Giles (August 1981, set in October 1139)
7. The Virgin in the Ice (April 1982, set in November 1139)
8. The Sanctuary Sparrow (January 1983, set in the Spring of 1140) (Note: This and other First Edition offerings indicate 1983 for the Macmillan edition)
9. The Devil's Novice (August 1983, set in September 1140)
10. Dead Man's Ransom (April 1984, set in February 1141)
11. The Pilgrim of Hate (September 1984, set in May 1141)
12. An Excellent Mystery (June 1985, set in August 1141)
13. The Raven in the Foregate (February 1986, set in December 1141)
14. The Rose Rent (October 1986, set in June 1142)
15. The Hermit of Eyton Forest (June 1987, set in October 1142)
16. The Confession of Brother Haluin (March 1988, set in December 1142)
17. The Heretic's Apprentice (February 1989, set in June 1143)
18. The Potter's Field (September 1989, set in August 1143)
19. The Summer of the Danes (April 1991, set in April 1144)
20. The Holy Thief (August 1992, set in February 1145)
21. Brother Cadfael's Penance (May 1994, set in November 1145)

The numbering of the Brother Cadfael Chronicles as published in paperback by Mysterious Press does not include A Rare Benedictine (instead, the cover refers to it as "The Advent of Brother Cadfael"); the total of the numbered chronicles (by Mysterious Press) is therefore 20 (per the covers of this set).

All of the novels are also available as audiobooks. Narrators include Vanessa Benjamin (The Devil's Novice from Blackstone Audio), Philip Madoc, Derek Jacobi, Roe Kendall, Stephen Thorne, Patrick Tull and Johanna Ward. The series is also available as e-books from multiple sources, as noted in the publication history for each novel.

The first two novels in the series, along with Cadfael Country: Shropshire and the Welsh Borders, are available as one edition from Mysterious Press.

Seven Cadfael Omnibus editions were published, with three novels in each volume. Most are available as paperbacks, and were later published in hardback.

- First Cadfael Omnibus A Morbid Taste for Bones, One Corpse Too Many, Monk's-Hood (December 1990 Sphere ISBN 0751504769 / 9780751504767 UK edition)
- Second Cadfael Omnibus Saint Peter's Fair, The Leper of Saint Giles, The Virgin in the Ice (October 1991 Sphere ISBN 0751507296 / 9780751507294 UK edition)
- Third Cadfael Omnibus The Sanctuary Sparrow, The Devil's Novice, Dead Man's Ransom (September 1992 Sphere ISBN 0751501115 / 9780751501117 UK edition)
- Fourth Cadfael Omnibus Pilgrim of Hate, An Excellent Mystery, The Raven in the Foregate (September 1993 Sphere ISBN 0751503924 / 9780751503920 UK edition)
- Fifth Cadfael Omnibus The Rose Rent, The Hermit of Eyton Forest, The Confession of Brother Haluin (September 1994 Sphere ISBN 0751509493 / 9780751509496 UK edition)
- Sixth Cadfael Omnibus The Heretic's Apprentice, The Potter's Field, The Summer of the Danes (January 1996 Sphere ISBN 0751515892 / 9780751515893 UK edition)
- Seventh Cadfael Omnibus The Holy Thief, Brother Cadfael's Penance, A Rare Benedictine (September 1997 Sphere ISBN 0751520810 / 9780751520811 UK edition)

There is also a three-book "collection pack set" containing the first three books ("A Morbid Taste for Bones", "One Corpse Too Many" and "Monk's Hood" as separate books.

An omnibus edition published as The Brother Cadfael Mysteries (published by Quality Paperback Book Club, New York, in 1995) contains The Leper of Saint Giles, Monk's Hood, The Sanctuary Sparrow and One Corpse Too Many.

=== Short stories ===
- Published in A Rare Benedictine: The Advent of Brother Cadfael (1988):
  - A Light on the Road to Woodstock (set in Autumn 1120)
  - The Price of Light (set at Christmas 1135)
  - Eye Witness (set in Spring 1140)

== Adaptations ==
=== Stage ===
A stage adaptation of The Virgin in the Ice starred Gareth Thomas as Cadfael.

=== Radio ===
BBC Radio 4 produced adaptations of several novels in the Cadfael Chronicles with three different actors voicing Cadfael.

Starring Ray Smith as Cadfael:

1 – A Morbid Taste for Bones (1980) with Steven Pacey as "Brother John"

Starring Glyn Houston as Cadfael:

2 – One Corpse Too Many (1989) with Geoffrey Whitehead as "Adam Courcelles"

Written and produced by Bert Coules and starring Philip Madoc as Cadfael:

3 – Monk's Hood (1991), with Sir Michael Hordern as "The Narrator", Geoffrey Whitehead as "Prior Robert" and Timothy Bateson as "Father Heribert"
6 – The Virgin in the Ice (1992) with Sir Michael Hordern as "The Narrator" and Douglas Hodge as "Hugh Beringar"
9 – Dead Man's Ransom (1995) with Michael Kitchen as "The Narrator", Jonathan Tafler as "Hugh Beringar" and Susannah York as "Sister Magdelen"

=== Television dramas ===
Produced in Britain by Central for ITV, 75 minutes per episode. Filmed on location in Hungary and starring Sir Derek Jacobi. All thirteen episodes have been released on DVD.
