= Warrisius de Peche =

Warrisius de Peche was one of the first generation of Norman colonisers in Ireland.

In 1219, the Norman landowners, Warrisius de Peche, of the Manor of Lucan and Adam de Hereford, Lord of Leixlip, (Strongbow's right-hand man, and the Norman knight responsible for the construction of Leixlip Castle in 1172) granted to the brethren known as the order of the canons of St. Victor, the lands of St Katherine's, the Prior John Warrisius, Bishop of Meath Simon Rochfort and the Archbishop of Dublin Henry de Loundres are mentioned in the documents.

Warrisius de Peche is referenced also in the in some books as a Norman landowner. Probably the son of Bishop Robert Peche, Dugdale and Banks claim that Robert of Peche (died 1126), medieval bishop of Coventry, had two sons, one of whom was the future Bishop of Lichfield, Richard Peche.

The book History of Ireland of 1885, mentions him as lord of the lands of St. Catherine, with the knight Adam de Hereford and lord of Leixilip, with the nobleman John Warrisius (probable son of Warrisius de Peche) prior of St. Catherine and lord of Lucan. The book tells that they had to find six chaplains to celebrate the divine offices forever in St. Catherine's Priory, for the souls of all their ancestors.
