= The Heretic's Apprentice =

1989 novel by Ellis Peters

- First edition
- Author: Ellis Peters
- Series: The Cadfael Chronicles
- Genre: Mystery novel
- Publisher: Headline
- Publication date: February 1989
- Media type: Print (Hardcover, Paperback), audio book & e-book
- Pages: 279
- ISBN: 0-7472-0103-X
- OCLC: 60313318
- Preceded by: The Confession of Brother Haluin
- Followed by: The Potter's Field

The Heretic's Apprentice is a medieval mystery novel by Ellis Peters set in June 1143. It is the 16th novel in the Cadfael Chronicles and was first published in 1989.

A returning pilgrim from the Holy Land brings a dowry gift and mind fresh with ideas, leading to charges of heresy and a murder in his household, at the time for celebrating the translation of Saint Winifred's bones to Shrewsbury Abbey. Brother Cadfael, Abbot Radulfus, and Sheriff Hugh Beringar work together to find the murderer, and more difficult, the motive for murder. Bishop Roger de Clinton and an Augustinian canon of the Archbishop of Canterbury bring out the challenge of deciphering true religious belief from heresy, on the border with Wales in the midsummer days of 1143.

== Plot summary ==
The story takes place from 19 to 27 June 1143.

Just across the Channel, so close to home, William of Lythwood dies after a seven-year pilgrimage to the Holy Land. His servant Elave carries his master's body back home to Shrewsbury, straight to the Abbey where the funeral will take place. Elave shares the sad news with William's wool- and vellum-trading household in town, and delivers the dowry gift meant for Fortunata, his foster daughter. Not all the household is happy to see Elave return to town. Aldwin, his insecure replacement for the clerking work, charges Elave with heresy, charges taken all too seriously by a visiting Augustinian canon from the Archbishop of Canterbury. Abbot Radulfus handles this issue with due seriousness, but with a cooler head than the peremptory canon.

Once aware that his job is in no way threatened by Elave, Aldwin leaves to recant his charges at the Abbey. His body is found in the river next morning by Cadfael. Sheriff Hugh Beringar and Madog of the Dead Boat join to hunt for the killer. Elave is surprised by Fortunata, grown beautiful while he was away. Others in the household are taken more by the new dowry unseen in a magnificent box. Fortunata, drawn into the testimony about the supposed heresies, is drawn also to Elave. For his safety from the canon, Elave is held in a solitary cell in the Abbey, now a suspect of both heresy and murder.

Girard of Lythwood returns home, gone just a week to get the local wool clip ready to sell, to learn all the changes at once: his uncle home from his pilgrimage but dead and buried; his clerk murdered; his head shepherd Conan taken by the Sheriff; Elave home and suspected. He opens the box with Fortunata's dowry, finding 570 silver pennies. Father Elias will not bury Aldwin until he knows he confessed and was absolved. Aldwin confessed to Father Eadmer, replacing Father Boniface on the festival day; this settles his burial in blessed ground, and removes guilt of his murder from Elave due to the time of Aldwin's encounter with Father Eadmer, during Vespers.

The beautiful old box comes to the Abbey in a failed appeal to use its contents as bail for Elave. Brother Anselm examines the box, noting its likely use to hold a valuable book. Elave and Brother Cadfael have their first chance to hear and hold it since Elave arrived five days earlier, both aware it has changed in sound and weight. Cadfael and Hugh ask Conan more questions about the night before William's funeral before Hugh releases him, free of suspicion of Aldwin's murder. Cadfael seeks a motive for the murder of Aldwin. Fortunata gives her Uncle Jevan the box, in hopes she will learn the original contents. Cadfael and Hugh seek Fortunata, fearing for her safety. Jevan heads to his workshop near Frankwell when he notices the key to it is missing at home. Fortunata is searching his workshop for the missing box, thoroughly but without success.

Jevan faces Fortunata, slowly confessing how he killed Aldwin, believing (wrongly) that Aldwin had seen the contents of the box, as Jevan had, before Girard returned. He covets that ancient book. But he loves his niece; he is frozen in indecision, while Fortunata believes he will not kill her. Hugh and Cadfael arrive. Hugh calls to Jevan, with his good news of Conan. Jevan slips a knife up his sleeve as he grabs Fortunata close to him. Hugh sees it, as does Elave, arriving by foot from the Abbey. With tensions high, all in this scene act as normal, to part Jevan and his niece.

Unseen by the others, Elave sets fire to the workshop to make Jevan free Fortunata. Jevan runs into the blaze to fetch his prize from the thatched roof. On fire himself, he runs to the river, but cannot swim, holding the box with both hands.

Bishop Roger de Clinton arrives at the Abbey to resolve Elave's case. It is heard the next morning. Though not to Canon Gerbert's satisfaction, the Bishop calmly questions Elave, deciding that there is no heretic before him. The canon proceeds on his errand to Earl Ranulf, now home again in Chester.

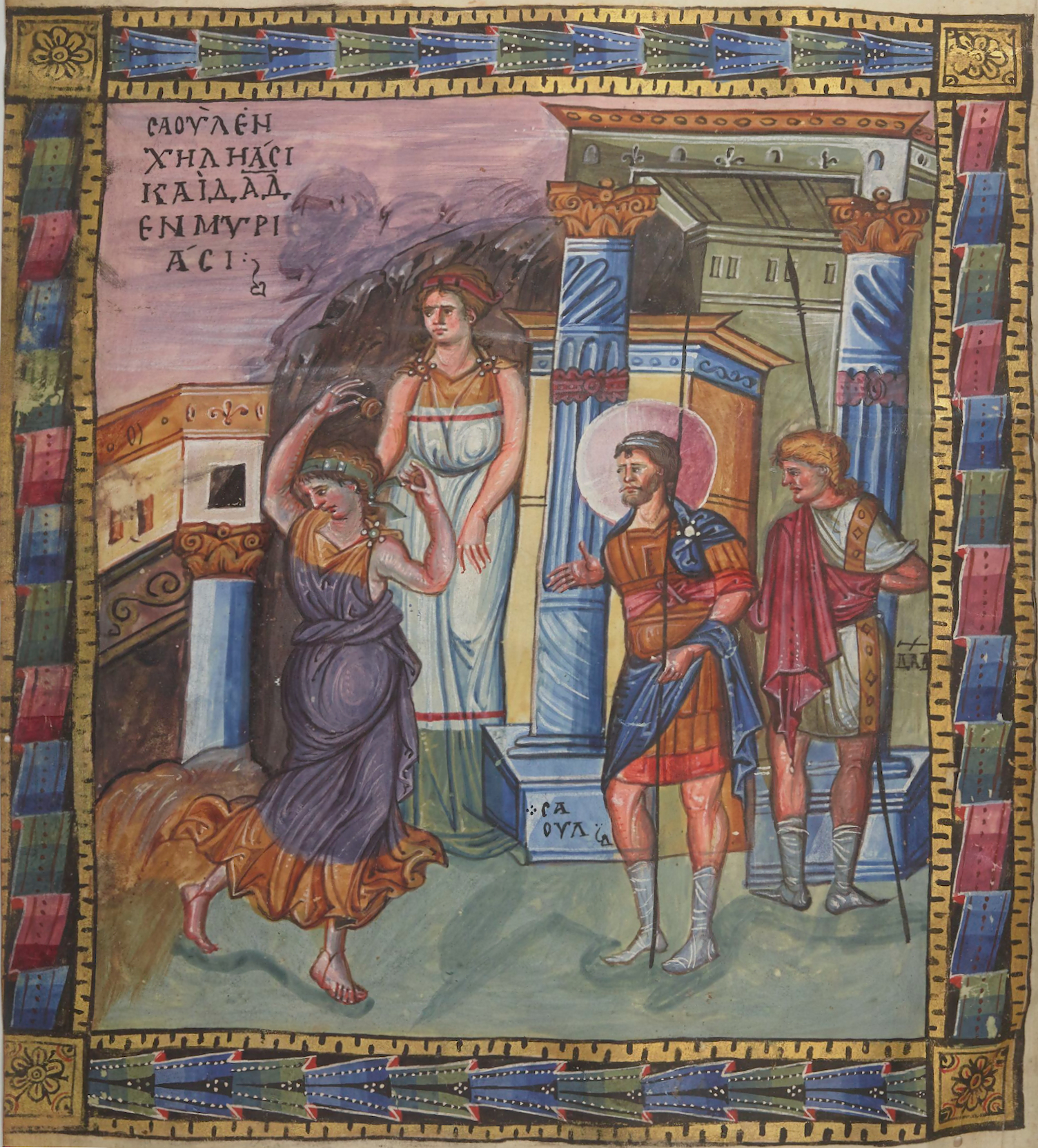
David glorified by the women of Israel in 10th century psalter.

Hugh arrives to tell them Jevan's body was found, and lays the well-wrapped package on the table in front of Anselm. Fortunata wishes it opened before witnesses. The beautiful box and its contents are unharmed by fire or river. The true dowry for Fortunata is a psalter, a gift from Otto I to his son's wife Theofanu in honour of their marriage in 972, nearly two centuries earlier, a magnificent melding of art styles from the East and the West. Diarmaid, an Irish monk of Saint Gall, inscribed it. In awe of the beauty of its images of King David, illuminations, and colours, all declare it beyond price. Fortunata considers her dowry gift carefully, choosing to give it to her Bishop, Roger de Clinton, for the diocesan library. He says he cannot pay her near its value. She has money for it already, and the best gift that William sent her was Elave.

The Bishop returns to Coventry with his gift. The bereaved family of Girard of Lythwood begins to heal its wounds and start life anew.

== Characters ==
- Brother Cadfael: He is the herbalist monk at the Abbey of Saint Peter and Saint Paul; about 63 years old in this story.
- Brother Winfrid: He is the assistant to Cadfael in the herbarium, a young monk. He was introduced in The Hermit of Eyton Forest.
- Prior Robert: Prior of the Abbey, he is a strict interpreter of doctrine in this story. He is based on the real prior of that year.
- Brother Jerome: He is clerk to Prior Robert, and a man who likes to carry tales, while currying favour with the Prior.
- Abbot Radulfus: Abbot of Shrewsbury Abbey the last four years. He is based on the real abbot of this time. He shows his calm, authoritative demeanor and quick decision making in this story.
- Brother Anselm: He is the Precentor and librarian for the Abbey. He gave books to Elave in his time in the Abbey cell.
- Brother Haluin: He is the best illuminator of manuscripts at the Abbey. He was consulted about the beautiful box and the likely meaning of the dust of gold and purple seen by Anselm and Cadfael. He was introduced in The Confession of Brother Haluin.
- Canon Gerbert: He is an Augustinian priest in service to Theobald, Archbishop of Canterbury. He was waylaid in the Abbey due to his lame horse while on a mission to Earl Ranulf of Chester from King Stephen. He is rigid on points of doctrine and who is permitted to consider them – priests or the laity.
- Serlo: He is a deacon of Bishop Roger de Clinton, travelling with Canon Gerbert as guide to this area in the Bishop's see of Lichfield and Coventry. He is a meek man with the unfortunate gift of speaking up at the wrong moment.
- Elave: He is the servant and apprentice in clerking duties to William of Lythwood, who travelled with his master on seven year pilgrimage, returning with his master's corpse to home in Shrewsbury. He is now 26 years old.
- William of Lythwood: Merchant in Shrewsbury. He left seven years earlier on pilgrimage to Holy Land; on return trip, he fell ill, died at Valognes in Normandy, nearing 80 years old. He was a friend of the late Abbot Heribert, the abbot who preceded Radulfus.
- Margaret: She is married to Girard of Lythwood. The couple is childless, so raise William's foster child. She is in her early 40s; mistress of their home near Saint Alkmund's church in Shrewsbury.
- Girard of Lythwood: He is the nephew and heir to William of Lythwood. He manages sheep and sells the wool clip for himself and others. Head of the household, he is a cheerful and honest man.
- Jevan of Lythwood: He is the unmarried brother of Girard, who is skilled in making high quality vellum from sheepskin. He is part of the household in Shrewsbury. He is seven years younger than Girard, just past 40. He learned to read Latin as part of his trade in vellum, and is an orderly and calm man.
- Fortunata: She is the foster child of William of Lythwood, about 11 years old when he left. Girard and Margaret raised her after her own mother died. She is now an attractive young woman who speaks out clearly, with a knack for good timing as to when to speak.
- Conan: He is head shepherd in the Girard household. He is 27 years old, and fearful of telling the truth.
- Aldwin: He is a clerk in Girard's service, trained by Elave before leaving seven years prior to story. He is an insecure man, doing work at the limit of his abilities. He accuses Elave of heresy, fearing Elave will be taken back to replace him in the household, and is in his late 40s.
- Hugh Beringar: Sheriff of Shropshire in service of King Stephen. He is about 28 years old, married to Aline and father of 3 year old Giles. Hugh was introduced in One Corpse Too Many. In this novel, he is a persistent investigator, with considerable aplomb in a dangerous situation.
- Father Boniface: He is the young pastor of Holy Cross parish in the Foregate, replacement for the late Father Ailnoth (The Raven in the Foregate), and an improvement, per the judgment of Cynric the verger of Holy Cross.
- Father Elias: He is the parish priest of Saint Alkmund's church in Shrewsbury, where the family of Girard attended. He is a man of conscience on the rites of confession and death, who was introduced in One Corpse Too Many.
- Father Eadmer: He is a newly ordained priest, who served as deacon with Father Boniface, He is the nephew to Father Eadmer of Saint Eata parish of Attingham, and last confessor of Aldwin.
- Brother Rhun: He is a monk who was cured by a miracle of Saint Winifred two years earlier on the day of her translation to the Abbey. He now tends her altar. Introduced in The Pilgrim of Hate, he is about 18 years old.
- Madog of the Dead-Boat: He is a Welsh fisherman and ferry man, skilled in every turn of the Severn River, and thus finds its dead as well serving the living. He works with Cadfael and the Sheriff to reveal the mysteries of the river when used in murders.
- Bishop Roger de Clinton: He is the Bishop of the see including Lichfield, Coventry and the Shrewsbury Abbey, and a supporter of King Stephen. He is nearing 60 years old and a real person in history. He arrives at the Abbey to resolve the heresy accusations hanging over Elave. He is reasonable and decisive in this novel.

== Setting in history ==
The story takes place in Shrewsbury Abbey. The site past Frankwell along the River Severn is a real location. Then Frankwell was outside the walls of Shrewsbury, considered a suburb.

Brother Cadfael sought young Father Eadmer at his uncle's home in Attingham. That is a real place about four miles to the southeast of Shrewsbury, near Attingham Park, not far from Wroxeter (mentioned in The Hermit of Eyton Forest, an earlier novel in the series).

The time was the Anarchy in England, when King Stephen was challenged by his cousin Empress Maud for the crown. In 1143, fighting was not near Shrewsbury; but King Stephen was acting to strengthen his connections with the border lords like Earl Ranulf of Chester. Young Henry Plantagenet, son of Empress Maud with her second husband, Geoffery of Anjou was in Bristol, age 10, taking lessons and spending time with his mother and uncle. That young man would become Henry II, succeeding King Stephen. Geoffrey spent his time keeping the holdings in Anjou and Normandy, never joining his wife to gain her the crown of England.

=== Pilgrimages and monasteries ===
Travel to pilgrimage sites rose steadily through the 12th century. There were many locations on the continent and in the British isles, but the ultimate destination for the European pilgrim was the Holy Land. A map of the Holy Land between the First and Second Crusades (in 1135) shows Edessa and the county of Tripoli, on either side of Antioch, and north of Jerusalem. Antioch is where Cadfael began and ended his own stay in the Holy Land years before, and where he met Mariam.

In this novel, William of Lythwood purchased the psalter from people fleeing Edessa, who he met in Tripoli. [Near modern-day Tripoli in Lebanon, as shown on the adjacent map.]

Pilgrims walked on land. Travel across the Mediterranean Sea may have been faster, but was equally hazardous and not very comfortable. The journey of William and his servant Elave was overland to the Holy Land, then used ships for the return to the Continent and then England. They stopped at other major sites, including Rome. Their journey was seven years duration, and nearly home, in France, William became ill in April 1142 and died about a year later. They stayed in monasteries as many nights as they could, including the priory of Saint Marcel near Chalon-sur-Saône, a daughter house of the Cluny Abbey when he first became ill. They encountered other pilgrims and heard the monks discuss religious ideas of the day, including Peter Abélard in his last months. Their stop at Santiago de Compostela (Saint-Jacques-de-Compostelle on the map) was in thanks for William's recovery at Saint Marcel. William was in his 70s for this pilgrimage, accompanied by his servant about 50 years younger than he. William had funds for this long journey (see map of Europe for a sense of the distance). On occasion, Elave worked to earn funds to keep the journey going, having skills in reading and writing, his numbers, and other clerking skills.

Long pilgrimages and the number of monasteries increased at the same time. The increase in monasteries eased the pilgrim's way, as monasteries of several orders provided hospitality for pilgrims and other travellers. Whether pilgrimages increased because monasteries needed the pilgrims and the resources they brought, or the strong faith of the pilgrims was a force too strong to contain has of course been debated. Although the rules of Benedict guided most monasteries, with cloistered life the aim, other monastic houses also increased in number, including Cluniac and Cistercian, all of whom welcomed pilgrims.

All the monasteries shared much in common, but their small differences could give way to small disputes, as highlighted in the novel. Gerbert is an Augustinian canon, Abbot Radulfus is head of an essentially independent Benedictine monastery with a cloister, and Bishop Roger de Clinton established a Cistercian house in his see, Buildwas Abbey. The author used these differences in the three men to strengthen the dialogue among them in deciding the fate of Elave as heretic or a believing Christian.

=== Heresies ===
Elave on his return after seven years away must first bear accusations that his master, William of Lythwood, spoke heresy and took the pilgrimage as penance, which were not true. The accusations came out in the presence of an Augustinian canon with strong views on heresy and anything but blind faith on the part of the laity. The Canon said: "Faith is to be received, not taken apart by the wit of a mere man". Elave successfully defends his master by telling he died shriven, which suffices for Abbot Radulfus. William is allowed to be buried at the Abbey in blessed ground as he wished.

The next day, he speaks too freely among the family, and is accused of speaking heresy himself by the clerk to William's nephew. This is more serious for him, especially once his accuser is found dead of a knife in the back. The dialogue when he faces the meeting of the clerics and monks is based on the heresies with supporters in that era, or far earlier, like the Patripassian heresy, which began in the third century, reflecting the challenge of belief in the Trinity, basic to Christianity.

The accusations against Elave were taken down by Prior Robert, under four heads. He read them out: "First, that he does not believe that children who die unbaptised are doomed to reprobation. Second, and as reason for that, he does not believe in original sin, but holds that the state of newborn children is the state of Adam before his fall, a state of innocence. Third, that he holds that a man can, by his own acts, make his own way towards salvation, which is held by the Church to be a denial of divine grace. Fourth, that he rejects what Saint Augustine wrote of predestination, that the number of the elect is already chosen and cannot be changed, and all others are doomed to reprobation. For he said rather that he held with Origen, who wrote that in the end all men would be saved, since all things came from God, and to God they must return."

True to form, Gerbert reacts harshly to the countering lines in the Bible and the writings of Saint Augustine spoken by the Bishop, saying "These are mysteries for the wise to ponder, if anyone dare".

Elave wins over these accusations with his basic declaration of faith learned as a child. His own Bishop considers all the charges and decides Elave is no heretic, rather a man thinking often and deeply about his faith. Brother Cadfael speculates at the close of the story that in other hands than Bishop Roger de Clinton, Elave's fate could have been "anathema".

Canon Gerbert was not alone in this era in his worries about heresy and schism in the Christian church. Bernard of Clairvaux of northeastern France expressed similar concerns in the south of France, where very different conditions held. Shrewsbury and England were safe from the threat of multiple heresies and their official consequences (the Inquisition) for some decades yet.

In a conversation that Brother Anselm has with Elave the remark is made that theological disputes and accusations of heresy "come of trying to formulate what is too vast and mysterious to be formulated." (Chapter 10)

== Publication history ==
Four hardback editions were issued, of which the most recent two are large print. February 1989 and March 1990 saw the first UK and US editions, respectively. The latest at this source was in January 2001 by Center Point Large Print ISBN 978-1-58547-138-6 (USA edition). Six paperback editions in English have been issued, from 1990 to May 1994. The first one was by Futura ISBN 978-0-7736-7269-7 Canada (English speaking) edition. The latest was by Sphere ISBN 978-0-7515-1116-1 (UK edition).

Four audiobooks were issued, beginning in June 1994 by HarperCollins, read by Sir Derek Jacobi. The most recent was in 1997. All four were audio cassette editions.

A Kindle edition was published July 2013 (ASIN B00E6YTN4K, Publisher Velmon Books Pty Ltd).

The novel has been translated and published in French, Italian, Spanish, German and Dutch, listed on Goodreads.

- French: L'hérétique et son commis (Frère Cadfael, #16), Published 2001 by 10/18, Mass Market Paperback, ISBN 978-2-264-03342-0
- Italian: L'apprendista eretico (Mass Market Paperback), Published 2002 by TEA Teadue #965, 248 pages, Elsa Pelitti (Translator) ISBN 978-88-502-0167-9
- Spanish: El Aprendiz De Hereje, Publisher Grijalbo, Barcelona ©1992, 343 pages, María Antonia Menini (Translator), ISBN 978-84-253-2389-8
- German: Bruder Cadfael und der Ketzerlehrling, ISBN 978-3-455-05909-0
- Dutch: Het rechte pad [The Straight Path] (Paperback), Published 1996 by De Boekerij, 233 pages, Pieter Janssens (Translator) ISBN 978-90-225-1223-4

In addition to the Spanish and English language editions, WorldCat has holdings in Korean.

- Korean: 이단자의상속녀 : 엘리스피터스장편소설 [Heiress of a heretic] /Idanja ŭi sangsongnyŏ : Ellisŭ P'it'ŏsŭ changp'yŏn sosŏl, Sŏng-gyŏng Son (Translator), Publisher 북하우스, Sŏul-si Puk Hausŭ, 2001, ISBN 978-89-87871-66-0

The latest English language print edition shown in the WorldCat holding is The heretic's apprentice, Large print book, Publisher Sphere, London, 2008 ISBN 0-7515-1116-1.
