= Dead Man's Ransom =

1984 novel by Ellis Peters

- First edition
- Author: Ellis Peters
- Series: The Cadfael Chronicles
- Genre: Mystery novel
- Publisher: Macmillan
- Publication date: 1984
- Media type: Print (Hardcover, Paperback) & audio book
- Pages: 224
- ISBN: 0-333-36455-4
- OCLC: 769471424
- Preceded by: The Devil's Novice
- Followed by: The Pilgrim of Hate

Dead Man's Ransom is a medieval mystery novel by Ellis Peters, first of four novels set in the disruptive year of 1141. It is the ninth in the Cadfael Chronicles, and was first published in 1984.

The book was adapted for BBC Radio 4 in 1995.

The Sheriff of Shropshire is wounded and taken prisoner by Welsh on the side of Empress Maud in a major battle. His return requires an exchange, bringing two lively young Welshmen into the castle where the Sheriff's daughter resides. Welshmen on the border with England see opportunities for their own benefit as the chaos in England continues, with the King captured.

This novel received some enthusiastic and positive reviews at the time of publication. The plot includes "a denouement that combines rough justice and love triumphant." The novel overall was described as "charmingly inventive, textured with intriguing subplots, and as rich as ever in fresh period details." Another reviewer found that "local color is at its most engaging ". Another remarked favorably on both the setting in the 12th century, showing that human nature does not change, and the "canny Brother Cadfael, apostle of survival and a sensible degree of mercy". The novel showed "our Anglo-Saxon origins, along with gore enough to keep us flipping zestfully ahead through all the carnage."

== Plot introduction ==
England is in the grip of the Anarchy, as King Stephen and the Empress Maud contend for the throne. Ranulf of Chester sought the aid of the Empress's forces when he and his brother broke their agreement with King Stephen, and were joined by Madog ap Maredudd, Lord of Powys in Mid Wales, and Cadwaldr, the brother of Owain Gwynedd, ruler of Gwynedd in North Wales. A contingent from Shrewsbury and the county of Shropshire has gone to fight for King Stephen at Lincoln.

== Plot summary ==
In February 1141 Hugh Beringar, Deputy Sheriff of Shropshire, returns with the survivors of the Battle of Lincoln, bringing news of a disastrous defeat. King Stephen has been captured, and the future of England is uncertain. Sheriff Gilbert Prestcote has been taken prisoner by Welshmen allied to Empress Maud.

Two days later, Sister Magdalen, from the nearby convent at Godric's Ford, reports a raid by Welshmen returning from Lincoln. They were driven off, leaving a young man as prisoner. He pretends not to understand English but Brother Cadfael, sent to treat his wounds, easily catches him out. The prisoner identifies himself as Elis ap Cynan, a cousin to Owain Gwynedd. Hugh Beringar dispatches Cadfael into Wales to negotiate an exchange of prisoners: Elis for Gilbert Prestcote.

At Tregeiriog in Gwynedd, the holding of Tudur ap Rhys and where Owain holds court, Cadfael meets Tudur's daughter Cristina, betrothed to Elis, and Eliud, Elis's foster-brother. He overhears them arguing, and concludes that Cristina is jealous of the close friendship between Elis and Eliud. Back in Shrewsbury Castle, Elis meets Prestcote's daughter Melicent, and they fall completely in love. Melicent believes that her father will never consent to their marriage.

Einon ab Ithel, one of Owain's captains, brings Prestcote from Wales. Eliud accompanies them, as Einon's groom and as the hostage to remain in Shrewsbury while Elis returns to Wales. Prestcote is ill and wounded, and is taken to the infirmary at Shrewsbury Abbey. While almost everyone in the Abbey is at their midday meal, Elis tells Eliud of his love for Melicent and his plan to ask her father for her hand in marriage. Elis goes to Prestcote's room, only to be ejected from the ward by Brother Edmund, the Infirmarer. As Einon prepares to leave, Eliud asks Cadfael to go with him to recover Einon's cloak, which he left behind in Prestcote's room. They find Prestcote dead, smothered in his sleep.

Einon will not ransom a live man with a dead one. Eliud, Elis and six others of Einon's party must remain as suspects. After Einon departs for Wales, Melicent accuses Elis of murdering her father, as only he was known to enter the room. As Elis protests his innocence, Cadfael recalls that an ornate gold pin which had fastened Einon's cloak was missing when Prestcote was found dead. Elis does not have it, so others must have entered the room. Elis and Eliud share a cell in the Castle under their parole of honour not to leave. After her father's funeral, Melicent departs for Godric's Ford with Sister Magdalen, sorting out her own feelings.

Cadfael closely examines the body of Prestcote and recovers richly-dyed woollen threads and some gold thread, which came from the cloth used to smother him. No cloth within the Abbey matches them. Suspicion next falls on Anion ap Griffri, a lay servant recovering from a broken leg. Prestcote had ordered his half-brother to be hanged for his part in a fatal brawl, providing motive. Anion flees.

Hugh Beringar takes half of his armed men to join forces with Owain Gwynedd to deal with raids by Ranulf of Chester in the northern part of the county. In his absence, men from Powys gather for another raid. Cadfael takes the news to Tregeiriog, where Owain Gwynedd and Hugh Beringar will meet. There, Cristina tells Cadfael that her father has freed her to marry whom she loves. Cadfael realises his earlier mistake. Cristina and Eliud are in love with each other, but Eliud never spoke of his love from loyalty to Elis.

At the evening meal, Anion appears, as his father asks that this son be recognised as his heir. He is wearing the gold pin taken from Prestcote's room. Einon accuses him of theft but Anion explains that he thought the pin was Prestcote's and gave it to his father as galanas for the half-brother Prestcote hanged.

Before dawn, Hugh Beringar arrives with news that the raiders from Powys are nearing Godric's Ford. In the bustle of getting fresh horses, Cadfael sees Einon's ornate saddlecloth and realises it was the murder weapon. He now knows who the murderer is, but tells no one. He asks Owain Gwynedd whether atonement for Prestcote's murder requires another death, pleading that atonement by penitence would be preferable. Owain agrees, holding that guilt is considered in degrees.

At Shrewsbury castle, Elis overhears the news of the raid on Godric's Ford. Frantic for Melicent's safety, he breaks his parole and makes his way there on foot. Hugh Beringar's lieutenant, Alan Herbard, sets out to intercept the raiders. He takes Eliud with him, under sentence of death if Elis proves false. As the raiders arrive to attack the convent, Elis confronts them, saying in Welsh that they are shameful to attack innocent holy women. A Welshman looses an arrow at him, but Eliud throws himself in front of Elis and the arrow pins them together, wounding both of them. Beringar and Herbard arrive, and the raiders are routed and flee into Powys.

Eliud confesses Prestcote's murder to Cadfael. Before he met Elis at the Abbey, Eliud went to Prestcote's chamber to recover Einon's cloak, with Einon's saddlecloth on his arm. Desperate to prevent Elis returning to marry Cristina, he smothered Prestcote with it, regretting it even as he acted. It was for naught, as he learned minutes later, when Elis confessed his love for Melicent. Eliud left the cloak behind and later asked Cadfael to accompany him to the room to ensure that the death was discovered. Melicent overhears the confession.

Hugh Beringar charges Eliud for Prestcote's murder. Hugh sends the six Welshmen who are still at Shrewsbury to carry Elis back to Wales. Elis and Melicent conspire to substitute an unconscious Eliud for Elis, thus removing Eliud from Hugh's jurisdiction. Cadfael and Sister Magdalen look the other way.

Beringar cannot press any charge against Elis. Elis will return to Wales when he is healed, and court Melicent in proper form. Eliud and Cristina are reunited in Wales, where justice lies with Owain Gwynedd. Cadfael observes to Hugh Beringar that even God, when He intends mercy, needs tools to His hand.

== Characters ==
- Brother Cadfael: Benedictine monk at the Abbey of Saint Peter and Saint Paul. He was born in North Wales, and lived an adventurous life, including participating in the First Crusade. He is fluent in Welsh and English. He joined the Abbey in his middle years, where he is the herbalist. He is 61 years old in this novel.
- Abbot Radulfus: Head of the Benedictine Abbey of Saint Peter and Saint Paul in Shrewsbury, based on the real abbot of that time, sometimes called Ranulf in historical documents. He is a man of authority and quick decision who lets Cadfael leave the Abbey on occasion for special requests from Deputy Sheriff Hugh Beringar or for his own pursuit of information.
- Brother Edmund: Infirmarer at the Abbey. He feels responsible for failing to have a constant watch on the ailing sheriff, none aware of any threats to his life in his home territory. In truth, he takes diligent care of those in his charge, and was the one to recall that Anion was still walking with his crutch as his leg slowly healed.
- Brother Rhys: Blind older monk. He is in the infirmary when Sheriff Prestcote is there; he hears the sounds of who enters and leaves the Sheriff's room.
- Brother Oswin: Assistant to Cadfael in the herbarium. He has improved greatly in his skills. He handles everything as to making of medicines while Cadfael travels twice to Wales. He is about 20 or 21 years old, and was introduced in The Leper of Saint Giles.
- Gilbert Prestcote: Sheriff of Shropshire. He was appointed by King Stephen in One Corpse Too Many. He owns manors on the borders with Wales, giving him a history of disputes with his Welsh neighbours, holding strong views against them. He is in his late fifties in this story. He took wounds at the battle of Lincoln and was taken prisoner by Cadwaladr. His wounds lay him very low, but both Welsh and English expect him to recover fully with time and care. In his weakest moment, he is murdered.
- Melicent Prestcote: Daughter of Sheriff Gilbert Prestcote by his first wife. She is about 18 in this story, with golden blonde hair. She falls in love with Elis ap Cynan. She fears her father will not like her choice, but never asked him.
- Sybilla, Lady Prestcote: Second wife of Gilbert Prestcote. She is the mother of his only son, 7-year-old Gilbert, who will inherit his father's lands. She and her family await Prestcote's return in the Castle, where Elis is held, then move to the Abbey guest house when Prestcote returns still weak from his wounds. She is twenty years younger than her husband, so in her later thirties.
- Hugh Beringar: Deputy Sheriff of Shropshire. He was appointed by King Stephen in One Corpse Too Many. He is 26 years old in this story. His manors are in Maesbury near the borders with Wales. He is a close friend with Cadfael, and put to the test of defending the shire when the Sheriff dies.
- Aline Beringar: Wife of Hugh. She is 21 years old in this story. Cadfael joins her to visit with his godson Giles, now walking, and await the return of Hugh from the battle of Lincoln. She was introduced in One Corpse Too Many.
- Alan Herbard: Young lord in Shropshire. He is appointed to hold Shrewsbury Castle in Hugh Beringar's absence, and is quickly challenged with his first defence actions.
- John Marchmain: 19-year-old cousin of Hugh Beringar. He is left as surety for Prestcote in the exchange of prisoners, and serves as messenger from Owain Gwynedd to Hugh Beringar on his return.
- Sister Magdalen: Nun at the Benedictine cell at Godric's Ford. She was introduced in The Leper of Saint Giles as the postulant Avice of Thornbury, and is now a full member of the nunnery, well-established with her colleagues and the people living nearby. She is a resourceful woman who attracts friends easily in her new life, and renews her acquaintanceship with Cadfael in this story, concluding in their becoming good friends.
- John Miller: Forester at Godric's Ford. He is a huge and strong man, of service to the nuns there in the attack and later to the wounded cousins from Wales recovering from the second attack.
- Anion ap Griffri: Half-Welsh lay servant of the Abbey skilled with livestock. He is in the infirmary mending a broken leg when Sheriff Prestcote is returned to Shrewsbury. He was born illegitimate to his English mother, and later met his Welsh half-brother. In this story, he seeks out his Welsh father for the first time, to be claimed as a son with full rights by Welsh law, when he is about 27 years old.
- Griffri ap Llywarch: Welshman in Owain's domain. He is the father of Anion ap Griffri, which he is delighted to learn when Anion comes to visit him in Wales. He is about 50 years old.
- Elis ap Cynan: Young landed Welshman. He chose unwisely to join the fighting at Lincoln under Cadwaladr, whose group left him behind, nearly drowned, after they tried to attack the nuns at Godric's Ford. He is distant cousin to Owain Gwynedd, of princely upbringing. He was betrothed in youth to Cristina. He speaks Welsh and English, and has the gift of the bard's tongue. He first feels love for a woman when held at Shrewsbury Castle. He is 21 years old, cousin to Eliud, and raised as foster brothers when his parents died young.
- Eliud ap Griffith: Son of Griffith ap Meilyr. He was raised from infancy with his cousin and foster-brother Elis. He loves Cristina. He arrives in Shrewsbury as groom to Einon ab Ithel, to be left as surety in the exchange of prisoners. He is 21 years old, and is watchful of his foster brother, who is less cautious in life.
- Owain Gwynedd: Prince of Gwynedd in north Wales, real historical person. He talks with both Hugh Beringar and Brother Cadfael as the former seeks to put down common enemies and the latter seeks the proof of the murderer.
- Cristina merch Tudur: Daughter of Tudur. She is a Welsh girl betrothed in youth to Elis. She loves Eliud from childhood, but does not speak up for her true wishes until the midst of this story, getting her father's support in choosing her own husband. She has dark hair and dark eyes, is about 18 years old in this story.
- Tudur ap Rhys: Welsh retainer of Owain Gwynedd. He is father of Cristina and a lord of Tregeiriog whose manor is used as a base by Owain for the necessary defence against Chester's forces.
- Einon ab Ithel: Captain under Owain. He leads the party returning the ailing, captured Sheriff Prestcote to Shrewsbury. He is a wealthy man, owning extensive lands with gold mined on them. He is a big muscular man in his forties.

== Background ==
Like all of the Cadfael Chronicles, the book describes events in England and Wales at the time of The Anarchy, the civil war between King Stephen and the Empress Maud for the throne of England. The Battle of Lincoln was real and took place as described in the novel, including the defeat of Stephen's forces, the capture of Stephen, and the involvement of a Welsh force under Madog and Cadwaladr. Many other real historical figures who acted in the Anarchy are mentioned in the text; for example, Ranulf of Chester, Robert of Gloucester, and William of Ypres.

During the time of the story, Empress Maud connected with Bishop Henry of Winchester, who invited her to Winchester Cathedral. The Archbishop of Canterbury visited Henry's captive brother King Stephen. King Stephen is unruffled even as his brother turned his coat away from him. But the Archbishop of Canterbury did not ultimately support Empress Maud's claim in this tumultuous year of 1141.

Wales at the time was not a single principality, but was divided into several small ones. Powys, under Madog ap Maredydd, intervened in England's troubles on the side of the Empress. Powys at the time held Caus Castle, only a few miles from Shrewsbury, and used it as a base from which to launch livestock-thieving raids into English territory.

Gwynedd under Owain Gwynedd remained aloof from England's quarrels, but Owain Gwynedd's wayward younger brother, Cadwaladr ap Gruffydd, took some men from Gwynedd to the Battle of Lincoln alongside the Powys contingent. Both historically and in later books in the Brother Cadfael series, Owain several times exiled Cadwaladr only to be later reconciled with him.

Owain Gwynedd appears prominently in the novel. He is portrayed as a more statesmanlike character than the other Welsh rulers, and makes common cause with Hugh Beringar to deter Maud's ambitious allies. He must manoeuvre carefully to repair the damage done by Cadwaladr, whose men capture Gilbert Prescote, the fictional Sheriff of Shrewsbury, but lose the fictional Elis ap Cynan in the misguided raid on Godric's Ford on the way home.

Although the capital of Gwynedd was at Aber, Owain Gwynedd maintained a shifting court which accompanied him as he travelled throughout the Principality to face rebellion or external threats or to dispense justice. To address the attacks to his border with Ranulf of Chester, Owain Gwynedd set up court at Tregeiriog, close to the border needing protection. The manor (maenol) of his retainer Tudur ap Rhys was convenient.

The story takes place in several locations in England and Wales. The Abbey and Castle are in Shrewsbury. The resting place for the wounded Sheriff Prestcote en route to home is Montford just a few miles northwest of the Castle. Joining with Owain Gwynedd at Rhydycroesau to quell the raids by their common enemy Ranulf of Chester, Beringar and his men travelled along his northern border, fighting or leaving guards at Oswestry, Whitchurch, Whittington, Ellesmere, the castle at Chirk, then returning to Tregeiriog. When Cadfael travelled alone on his second journey to Tregeiriog, he stayed the night at Oswestry Castle, then crossed Offa's Dike on his route. The Powys Welsh raiders of Godric's Ford on their second raid left a trail of damage in Pontesbury and neighbouring Minsterley to the southwest of Shrewsbury before again losing to the Shropshire defenders.

The Welsh characters are named by patronymics e.g. Elis ap (= son of) Cynan, or Einon ab Ithel, where the patronymic begins with a vowel. Cadfael himself was born in Trefriw in Gwynedd. Though not used within the Abbey, his full Welsh name is Cadfael ap Meilyr ap Dafydd, and he claims he would be ashamed if he could not trace his ancestry back five generations. The only female whose name is mentioned is Cristina merch (= daughter of) Tudur.

== Continuity ==
Philip Corviser, son of the town Provost and like him a boot maker, attends the funeral of the Sheriff with his wife Emma. Emma Vernold was a main character in Saint Peter's Fair, set in autumn 1139, the fourth novel in the series. She was left on her own by the murder of her uncle, though not short of inheritance. At the end of the story, she became attached to Philip, now her husband.

The events described of the changing fortunes of King Stephen, imprisoned, and Empress Maud, welcomed in London, hoping to be crowned, set the scene for the opening of the next novel in the series, The Pilgrim of Hate, and for parts of the plot.

== Reviews and critical reception ==
Kirkus Reviews was unusually positive about this novel, after describing the complexities of the plot. As "Cadfael closes in on the murderer—and brings on a denoument that combines rough justice and love triumphant." They concluded that the novel is "For anyone with a taste for period mystery: another fine Peters performance—charmingly inventive, textured with intriguing subplots, and as rich as ever in fresh period details."

Publishers Weekly commented that "Peters's local color is at its most engaging in the tangled family trees that sprawl across a contentious border."

Cecily Felber, an author herself, explained how this novel inspired her to write her own, in the same era and part of the world. She described that "This is the book, with its mentions of Madog ap Maredudd and the contingent of Welsh soldiers who took part in the Battle of Lincoln, that is partly responsible for my own books. ... Another charming step along the journey of Cadfael!"

In a brief review, Nick B Williams, Sr in the Los Angeles Times found this a fascinating chronicle that will hold the reader's interest..

== Publication history ==
Dead Man's Ransom was first published in the UK by Macmillan in April 1984 ISBN 0333364554 / 9780333364550. Five hardback editions were issued in all, the latest in large print by Chivers in October 1999.

Nine paperback editions have been issued, starting in March 1985 with the Sphere UK edition. The latest was published in April 2012 by Sphere.

Fourteen audio editions have been published, beginning in 1991. The latest edition was by Blackstone Audio Books in August 2012 on CD.

The Kindle edition was released in July 2013, ISBN B00DYV221W.

This book has been translated and published in French, German, Dutch, Swedish, and Italian. It has also been translated to Spanish, Portuguese, and Korean.

- French: La rançon du mort (Frère Cadfael, #9), Published 2001 by 10/18, Mass Market Paperback, ISBN 9782264033376
- German: Lösegeld für einen Toten (Bruder Cadfael, #9), Published 1995 by Heyne Deutsche Erstausgabe, 253 pages ISBN 9783453029507
- Dutch: De gouden speld [The Gold Pin], Paperback, Published 1990 by De Boekerij, 204 pages Pieter Janssens (Translator) ISBN 9789022510100
- Swedish: Lösen för den döde (Chronicles of Brother Cadfael #9), Paperback, 224 pages, | Bonnier, 1995 ISBN 9100558117
- Italian: I due prigionieri [The Two Prisoners], Paperback, Published 1 January 1995 by Tea, 235 pages ISBN 9788878197459
- Spanish: El Rescate del muerto, paperback, Grupo Editorial Random House Mondadori Debolsillo, Barcelona, 2002, María Antonia Menini (Translator) ISBN 9788497591676)
- Portuguese: O resgate do morto, Record, Rio de Janeiro, 1994, 223 pages ISBN 9788501039774)
- Korean: 죽은자의몸값 : 엘리스피터스장편소설 / Chugŭn cha ŭi mother kap : Ellisŭ P'it'ŏsŭ changp'yŏn sosŏl by Ellis Peters;(Translator) Ŭn-gyŏng Song 1999 Ch'op'an 북하우스, Sŏul, Buk Hausŭ, 326 pages ISBN 9788987871141)

== Radio adaptations ==
The book was adapted for BBC Radio 4 in 1995 by Bert Coules in five parts:

1. Hostage – The Battle of Lincoln has dire repercussions, with both King Stephen and Sheriff Prestcote captured, but an old acquaintance of Cadfael's provides him and Hugh Beringar with an opportunity to ransom the Sheriff from his captors.
2. Ambassador – Cadfael is sent into Wales to bargain for the wounded Sheriff Prestcote's release from the Welsh, but the prisoner exchange plans are thrown into disarray by love .... and murder.
3. A Princely Death
4. Allies
5. A Helping Hand – Elis and Eliud join in the defence of Godric's Ford, and in its aftermath the truth of Prestcote's murder comes out. Now Cadfael and Sister Magdelene must find a way to reconcile the truth with true justice weighed against the law.

It starred Philip Madoc as Brother Cadfael and Susannah York as Sister Magdalen. The serial has since been repeated on BBC Radio 7 and BBC Radio 4 Extra, and was released as an audio book.
