= Robert de Limesey =

11th and 12th-century Bishop of Chester and Bishop of Coventry

- Bishop of Coventry
- Province: Canterbury
- Appointed: 25 December 1085
- Term ended: 1 September 1117
- Successor: Robert Peche
- Other post: royal chaplain
- Previous post: Bishop of Chester

Orders
- Consecration: 1086

Personal details
- Died: 1 September 1117
- Denomination: Roman Catholic Church

Robert de Limesey (Note: Or Robert de Limesy, Robert de Limesi or Robert of Limesy) (died 1117) was a medieval cleric. He became Bishop of Chester in 1085, then his title changed to Bishop of Coventry when the see was moved in 1102.

Robert was a chaplain to King William I of England before the king nominated Robert to the see of Chester on 25 December 1085. He may have come from a baronial family, as his surname derives from a territorial location. Robert was consecrated in 1086. At some point during the last years of Archbishop Lanfranc of Canterbury, Robert took over the abbey of Coventry as the seat of his bishopric, and managed to establish himself there permanently after Lanfranc's death. Coventry was a wealthy abbey, richer than Chester, and by making Coventry the cathedral, Robert increased the revenue of his see by a large amount.

In 1102, Robert was one of the bishops, along with Gerard, Archbishop of York and Herbert de Losinga, the Bishop of Norwich, who returned from Rome and told King Henry I of England that Pope Paschal II had told them privately that Henry could invest bishops as in the past, provided they were good men. This was during the height of the Investiture Crisis, and the pope later denied the story. Robert had been part of a royal delegation to the papal curia to seek a resolution to the dispute between the king and archbishop Anselm of Canterbury over lay investiture. Robert also had business of his own at Rome, as he had sought permission from the pope to relocate his see from Chester to Coventry. Robert's effort to secure papal permission for the relocation of his see was successful. But, not only did the pope deny Robert's story, Pascal excommunicated all three bishops. Along with William Giffard, Bishop of Winchester; Samson, Bishop of Worcester; Ralph Luffa, Bishop of Chichester; Gerard, Archbishop of York; and Herbert de Losinga, Robert in 1106 wrote to Anselm, who was then in exile over the investiture crisis, asking the archbishop to return to England. In 1106, with the settlement between the pope and the king, the pope pardoned Robert and the other bishops.

Robert died on 1 September 1117.

== Citations ==
Catholic Church titles
Preceded by Peter	Bishop of Chester; 1085–1102	See moved to Coventry
New title	Bishop of Coventry; 1102–1117	Succeeded by Robert Peche
