= The Sanctuary Sparrow =

1983 novel by Edith Pargeter

- First edition
- Author: Ellis Peters
- Series: The Cadfael Chronicles
- Genre: Mystery novel
- Publisher: Macmillan
- Publication date: 1983
- Media type: Print (Hardcover, Paperback) & audio book
- Pages: 192
- ISBN: 0-333-34239-9
- OCLC: 233809069
- Preceded by: The Virgin in the Ice
- Followed by: The Devil's Novice

The Sanctuary Sparrow is a medieval mystery novel by Ellis Peters, set in spring 1140. Published in 1983, it is the seventh novel in The Cadfael Chronicles.

The story opens during the midnight service at the Abbey, when a young man seeks sanctuary, just seconds ahead of a mob of locals fresh from a wedding feast, charging him with theft and murder.

The novel was the second of the series to be adapted for television in 1994 by Central for ITV.

Reviewers found this story a bit more sentimental than earlier novels in the series. The plot reveals the killer sooner than expected, but this is not a drawback, as "a dramatic turn of events that leads to the exposure of the killer and the transformation of Liliwin into a hero."

== Plot summary ==
The story takes place over 7 days in May 1140.

At the midnight services of Matins on a lovely May night, a boy speeds into the Abbey church just ahead of mob after him for theft and murder. Abbot Radulfus stops the mob, grants the victim's request for sanctuary and successfully orders the mob to return in quiet the next morning to discuss their charges. Liliwin is a wandering jongleur and entertainer, evicted from the goldsmith's wedding reception earlier for breaking a wine jug during his routine.

The charge against Liliwin is robbery and assault, not murder. The term of sanctuary is forty days; if he leaves the grounds he will be taken. Abbot Herribut firmly asserts the rights of sanctuary for Liliwin, who protests his innocence. Daniel Aurifaber, grandson of the house, then requests Brother Cadfael to treat his grandmother at their home.

Cadfael treats Dame Juliana, and interviews several in the household. He retrieves the juggling balls that Liliwin left behind. The greed of Dame Juliana permeates the household. Cadfael shares his idea of Liliwin's innocence with Deputy Sheriff Hugh Beringar. Liliwin weeps for the loss of his rebec, which Cadfael finds on a walk back to the Abbey.

Liliwin is pleased to learn that the young maid Rannilt has sympathy for him. Brother Anselm teaches him to read and write music and works to restore the rebec to condition, and Liliwin thrives on regular meals in the Abbey. On Monday Rannilt visits Liliwin with food from Susanna, and discarded men's clothing from Margery, Daniel's new wife. Rannilt and Liliwin fall deeply in love, then make love and fall asleep behind the chapel altar during Vespers. Liliwin's absence is noted. Liliwin and Rannilt wake at Compline having slept too long. Liliwin escorts Rannilt home, risking his sanctuary for her safety. Liliwin sees Daniel leave the Aurifaber home that evening, which he later tells Brother Cadfael.

At the river's edge, Cadfael comes upon the body of Baldwin Peche the locksmith, the same person sought by Madog of the Dead-boat. They find clues of where Peche's body was put in the river the day before. The townspeople accuse Liliwin of this crime immediately. Liliwin denies the murder. Later, Liliwin confesses to Cadfael that he did leave the Abbey to take Rannilt home.

Margery lies to shield her new husband when Beringar questions her. Margery establishes her power and stops Daniel's affair, while removing the suspicion of murder from his head. Together they confess the truth of Daniel's whereabouts the night of the murder to Hugh Beringar. Secure with her husband, Margery steps up for the role of housekeeper, now held by her sister-in-law Susanna. Allowed no dowry for marriage, Susanna has kept the house over 15 years. Margery wins. Dame Juliana decides this while Cadfael is present, to be effective the next morning. Susanna puts her housekeeping accounts in order. Later that evening, her grandmother comes out to talk with her, giving a compliment on her management of the stores of oatmeal, which Rannilt overhears. Dame Juliana suffers her fatal stroke. Her dying words to Cadfael are that she wishes she could have held her great-grandchild.

The next day, Madog and Cadfael find the place of Peche's murder, where the Aurifaber property meets the Severn. Three plants grow there, found on his body. Further clues of rocks and a coin there point to the murderer, and the thief. Cadfael, Beringar and Liliwin realise that while Susanna could not have attacked her father during the party, an accomplice could have done so. Then Susanna retrieved the treasure from the well bucket and hid it in that oatmeal bin when the men chased after the jongleur. When Peche's servant boy gave him the coin from the bucket, Peche attempted to blackmail Susanna, a distinct mistake. When Peche approached Susanna in the midst of laundry day, she killed him by hitting him with a rock and drowning him when he was unconscious. She hid his body near the river where the laundry was dried, then sent Rannilt away so no one would see the body. Her accomplice moved it by night. Liliwin fears that Rannilt is in danger. Cadfael realises that Susanna is pregnant and her accomplice is her lover. This is what Dame Juliana meant in her last words. Her lover is the Welsh journeyman Iestyn, and they will leave this night.

Liliwin secures his freedom from Hugh Beringar. Walter leads the pursuit of his own daughter. Beringar, Cadfael, Liliwin and the sheriff's men pursue Susanna, Iestyn and Rannilt, taken as a witness. They corner the fugitives in the Aurifaber horse barn, where a tense hostage situation develops. Iestyn negotiates with Beringar for safe passage for Susanna, in exchange for the release of Rannilt. Walter objects to any bargain that risks his money. Liliwin the acrobat climbs to the air vent, quietly peels away the lattice wood and enters the hay loft in search of Rannilt. As dawn breaks, Rannilt slips toward the exit with Liliwin; then Iestyn goes for Liliwin with a knife. At the same moment, Susanna runs to Iestyn and takes the arrow meant for him. Hugh Beringar climbs to the loft to take heartbroken Iestyn from his dead lover. Walter runs about gathering his coins.

In the epilogue, Liliwin and Rannilt marry at the Abbey, and are compensated by the townsfolk for their mistaken judgment of the jongleur. Brother Anselm gives Liliwin his rebec, fully repaired. After the ceremony, Liliwin asks the fate of Iestyn. Beringar will argue in his favour, as Iestyn did no murder, what he stole is returned, and he acted at his lover's behest. Beringar sees a future for him. Liliwin and Rannilt set out on their new life.

== Characters ==
- Brother Cadfael: Herbalist monk at Shrewsbury Abbey. He is 60 years old in this story. A few months earlier, he became godfather to Giles Beringar, son of his friend Hugh.
- Abbot Radulfus: Head of the Benedictine Abbey of St Peter and St Paul. Described as tall with silver hair. He is somewhat authoritarian in his manner. They work together well in the two years since Radulfus became Abbot. He is fictional but based on the real abbot of this era (Ranulf in some records).
- Prior Robert Pennant: Prior Robert Pennant is portrayed as an aristocrat, concerned with status. He is offended by the presence of one who makes his living by entertaining people, bearing his presence only as a proper use of the right of sanctuary by the Abbot. He is fictional but based on a real man, who was Abbot after Radulfus.
- Brother Anselm: Precentor for the Abbey. In charge of the choirs and all music at the Abbey, he is talented in playing, directing, singing, and composing music, as well as repairing instruments.
- Brother Jerome: Confessor to the novices and clerk to Prior Robert. He is a rather petty man, jealous of his authority. He is not a tall man like Prior Robert, rather he is similar in size and shape, but not agility, to Liliwin, and twice his age.
- Brother Oswin: He is a young monk who is gaining in his skill as assistant to Brother Cadfael in the herbarium. He is about 19 or 20 years old, and was introduced in The Leper of Saint Giles.
- Liliwin: Young man of apparent Saxon heritage with fair hair and blue eyes. He is a jongleur with musical skills, working on his own. He is unsure of his parentage or age, perhaps 20, as he was raised by a troupe of jongleurs from his earliest memory. He is in Shrewsbury in hopes of work, which he finds at the wedding feast of Daniel Aurifaber.
- Dame Juliana Aurifaber: Mother to Walter, grandmother to Susanna and Daniel. She is 80 years old and in failing health, but still the force that energises the household of her son. She is greedy of money, and of her power over her family, harsh in punishment, miserly with the household goods in her day as housekeeper, and loathe to fully cede her power to supervise the household to the last minute of her life.
- Walter Aurifaber: Successful craftsman of Shrewsbury, the local goldsmith. He is widowed, father of Susanna and Daniel. He is perhaps late fifties in age, and both greedy and tightfisted with his money, like his mother, but weaker in character.
- Daniel Aurifaber: Son of Walter, younger brother of Susanna, newlywed husband of Margery. Trained as a goldsmith, Daniel stands to inherit his father's business and property, and is the spoiled favourite of both his father and grandmother. He is trained as a goldsmith, who works when his father keeps him at it. He is in his mid twenties.
- Susanna Aurifaber: Daughter of Walter, granddaughter of Juliana. She is the housekeeper for the last 15 years because her father will not grant her a dowry for her own marriage in her own social class. She is efficient, calm, hardworking, a match to her grandmother in force of character yet suffering from the main forces of the household. She is about 30 years old.
- Margery Aurifaber: Newlywed to Daniel as the novel opens. She is the only child of Edred Bele, a local cloth merchant. This was not a marriage of love, but a match of two with good expectations.
- Iestyn: Journeyman in Aurifaber goldsmith shop. He is Welsh, lives on their property, and is about 27 or 28.
- Rannilt: Young maid working under Susanna in the Aurifaber household. She is likely the child of unmarried parents in Wales, in her late teens, with dark hair and eyes.
- Baldwin Peche: Craftsman and local locksmith. He resides in a portion of the structure of the Aurifaber property, leased to him. He is an easy-going man, likes to fish the Severn and to keep up on the news of his neighbours. He is widowed, childless, in his fifties.
- John Boneth: Journeyman locksmith in the shop of Peche. He lives with his mother in the town, and will take over the shop as Peche has no son.
- Griffin: Boy in Peche household, age 13, helps in all household duties. He is considered slow by many but able to perform many tasks, and loyal to his master, who values him. He found the coin left in the water bucket the morning after the marriage feast, then gave it to his master.
- Cecily Corde: Young and attractive second wife of wool merchant Ailwin Corde, about 60. She is also the sometime paramour of Daniel Aurifaber. She is 23 years old.
- Madog of the Dead-Boat: Welsh man, expert on the Severn. He specialises in knowing the river's currents and where items lost in the river will wash-up on the shoreline.
- Deputy Sheriff Hugh Beringar: Second to Sheriff Prestcote, both firmly in King Stephen's service. A young man about 25 years old but a close companion to Brother Cadfael in the search for truth. He owns manors and is trained in the arts of war, and enforcing the King's peace in Shropshire. Introduced in One Corpse Too Many; married to Aline and father of the infant Giles, who was himself introduced in The Virgin in the Ice.
- Aline Beringar: Wife of Hugh and mother of young Giles. She takes Rannilt for a few days to ready her for her wedding, after all the excitement. She was introduced in One Corpse Too Many.

== Critical reception ==
The website of the Little, Brown Book Group quotes two favourable reviews.

- "Medieval England comes marvelously alive." – Washington Post
- "Murderous through they be, the Ellis Peters books set in 12th Century Britain have the freshness of a new world at dawn… Peters weaves a complex, colourful and at times quite beautiful tapestry. Medieval of course." – Houston Post

Kirkus Reviews finds this story of greed to be a bit sentimental. The novel was "a welcome treat for Brother Cadfael fans." There are many suspects for the attack on the goldsmith and the murder of the locksmith. leading to "a dramatic turn of events that leads to the exposure of the killer and the transformation of Liliwin into a hero."

Publishers Weekly reviewed an audio edition in 1992 for the plot structure. The reviewer found that "This seventh installment in the Brother Cadfael series could be faulted for revealing the murderer's identity a bit too soon, but the riveting climax more than compensates for the early disclosure."

"Goodtoread.org", an independent, Christian-orientated organisation, which reviews books on behalf of parents, calls Peter's writing style "consistently agreeable" and the novel's deathbed scene and comments on piety "edifying", but considers the book "marred by extra-marital lovemaking" and "less wholesome than one expects."

== Allusions to historical era and people ==
The novel is set in the real town of Shrewsbury in Shropshire, England.

Shrewsbury Abbey is a real abbey. Abbot Radulfus and Prior Robert Pennant are both real historical figures. Robert Pennant eventually succeeded Radulfus in 1148.

The body of the murder victim is found in the Severn river. Three plants growing in proximity are crucial clues for ascertaining where the murder took place: water crowfoot, alder, and the less common fox-stone (orchis masculata).

The story takes place during The Anarchy, a term referring to the 19-year civil war between King Stephen and his cousin the Empress Maud. This story is set at a moment of relative peace in Shrewsbury from the never-ending contention, with a focus on local events.

The plot relies in part on the Middle Ages practice in England of sanctuary from the civil authorities if a fugitive stays in a sacred place like a church. In this story, the time of sanctuary allowed the real culprits to be identified, saving a man of a lower class, the jongleur entertaining at the home of a goldsmith, from undeserved punishment.

Where the jongleur is here portrayed as the lower class but more diverse performer compared to the troubadour becoming common in this era (compare to the character Rémy of Pertuis in The Holy Thief), the character introduces much description of music, musicians, their skills and their instruments in the twelfth century in the story. The jongleur is an acrobat, a juggler, a singer and player of musical instruments. The jongleur Liliwin relies on a rebec to make music. He is a singer with his voice in the high range, as noted by the Precentor Brother Anselm. The Precentor is completely absorbed in music in his life as a monk, guiding the singing for daily services in the monastery, composing music for special Masses, and educated in both reading and writing the notes, a skill he teaches the jongleur Liliwin. The Precentor is also skilled in making and maintaining musical instruments. He repairs the broken rebec, and shares use of the portative organ with Liliwin, who quickly learns how to play it.

== Themes in The Sanctuary Sparrow ==
Greed and love are intertwined themes in this story. Even in a society where everyone seems to have a place, greed as a main force in a household can pervert the strongest love.

== Adaptations ==
The Sanctuary Sparrow was the second Cadfael story to be adapted for television. It was produced in Britain by Central for ITV in 1994, as a 75 minutes episode. It was mostly filmed on location in Hungary, starred Sir Derek Jacobi as Cadfael and featured Sean Pertwee as Sheriff Hugh Beringar, Steven Mackintosh as Liliwin and Sara Stephens as Rannilt. Prior Robert was portrayed by Michael Culver.

The episode was one of four released in an audio format with linking narration by Acorn Media.

== Publication history ==
- 1982, United Kingdom, Macmillan, ISBN 978-0-333-34239-8, 13 January 1982, Hardback
- 1983, USA, William Morrow & Co, ISBN 978-0-688-02252-5, October 1983, Hardback
- 1984, United Kingdom, Sphere, ISBN 978-0-7515-1107-9, 8 November 1984, Paperback
- 1984, USA, Fawcett Books, ISBN 978-0-449-20613-3, December 1984, Paperback
- 1985, United Kingdom, Ulverscroft Large Print, ISBN 978-0-7089-1288-1, April 1985, Hardback
- 1991, United Kingdom, Futura, ISBN 978-0-7088-2584-6, 1 November 1991, Paperback
- 1994, United Kingdom, Futura, ISBN 978-0-7088-1107-8,1994, Paperback
- 1995, USA, Mysterious Press, ISBN 978-0-446-40429-7, August 1995, Paperback
- 1999, USA, Thorndike Press, ISBN 978-0-7862-1599-7, January 1999, Paperback
- 1999, United Kingdom, Chivers Press, ISBN 978-0-7540-1191-0, January 1999, Hardback
- 2012, United Kingdom, Sphere, ISBN 9780751547085, April 2012, paperback

The book is available as an audio book from a variety of publishers and with various voice talents, with thirteen editions released from 1992 by Chivers to the most recent in August 2012 by Blackstone Audiobooks(ISBN 1441751661 / 9781441751669).
