= The Potter's Field (Peters novel) =

1989 medieval mystery novel by Ellis Peters

- First edition
- Author: Ellis Peters
- Series: The Cadfael Chronicles
- Genre: Mystery novel
- Publisher: Headline
- Publication date: September 1989
- Media type: Print, audio & e-book
- Pages: 256
- ISBN: 0-7472-0159-5
- OCLC: 21876408
- Preceded by: The Heretic's Apprentice
- Followed by: The Summer of the Danes

The Potter's Field is a medieval mystery novel by Ellis Peters set in August to December 1143. It is the 17th volume of the Cadfael Chronicles and was first published in 1989.

It was adapted for television in 1998 by Carlton Media and Central for ITV.

== Plot summary ==
The two monasteries are quick to seal the deal once they decide to trade two plots of land at Saint Peter's Fair in August 1143. By early October, the monks of the Abbey of Saint Peter and Saint Paul are in the newly acquired Potter's Field, setting the plough with a huge team of oxen to till the long fallow land. Soon into the work, they stop, having found what they least expect: the bones and long dark hair of a woman in her unblessed and unmarked grave. She has no marks of identity besides her hair, nor wounds to her bones to tell how she died. She held a cross made from twigs, the only sign she had been laid there by someone who wished her well. The civil authority and the monks must learn who she was, and how she came to her death.

The field was a gift from the lord of Longner Manor to the Augustine Priory at Haughmond Abbey, who then traded it to the Shrewsbury Abbey, as it was closer to them. For fifteen years, until fifteen months earlier, it was the home of a potter, Ruald and his wife Generys. Ruald is now a happy man in the monastery, finding his true calling. His wife is no longer in the area, abandoned by her husband's decision, not free to marry again, and not happy about her situation. Sulien Blount, novice monk, reports to Abbot Radulfus of the devastation of Ramsey Abbey, having survived the long walk. Learning of the local mystery, he shares the news that Generys was seen within the last three weeks, having sold her wedding ring to a silversmith in Peterborough as she and her new man flee the devastation of the Fens. Sulien shows the ring, given him for his sentimental attachment. This rules her out as the unfortunate woman now buried in the Abbey's cemetery, and frees Ruald of suspicion of being a murderer.

Geoffrey de Mandeville is destroying towns in the Fens, and ejecting the Benedictine monks from their monastery at Ramsey, in his rebellion against King Stephen. Sheriff Hugh Beringar is on battle alert, if King Stephen calls for support.

Britric of Ruiton, a pedlar of the area, used the empty cottage during Saint Peter's fair soon after it was abandoned. He shared it with Gunnild that year, a lovely woman not seen at this year's fair. He is the next suspect as murderer, and she as victim. Gunnild appears alive at the castle, releasing Britric, leaving the mystery of who is buried in the grave, and why Sulien acted in the release of each suspect.

Hugh's armed force sets off to assist King Stephen on 3 November, against the anarchy in East Anglia. They return at the end of the month, no men lost. In Peterborough, Hugh learns that Sulien lied in part about how he got the ring. Sulien lies a third time to Hugh, Cadfael and Radulfus to save the honour of his family, and is ready to die for that honour. Hugh deftly discerns that Sulien does not know the truth, because he was not party to the death or burial. Cadfael argues that it is time to stop shielding Sulien's mother Donata, by sharing this matter with her now. At Longner manor, Pernel has the same idea, telling Donata of the local mystery; the two were alone after Sulien, no longer a monk, left to see the Abbot.

Donata travels to the Abbey to tell Hugh, Cadfael, and Abbot Radulfus the story of the wager between her and Generys, the story of two identical cups, one with hemlock. Donata had not lain with her husband due to her illness for a few years. Generys sought help from her lord in persuading Ruald not to join the monastery. Generys and her liege lord Eudo Blount have an affair. Neither Donata nor Generys can bear sharing this man. Donata proposes the wager, the two conducting it so neither knows which cup has the poison. It is Generys in the grave, first buried by Eudo Blount, watched from afar by his younger son Sulien. After that, he joined the King's army in Oxford. The frail but steely Donata survives but feels she lost the wager.

Hugh decides this case is closed unsolved for him, but the name of the dead woman must be given out publicly. Donata will tell the whole truth to Pernel and Sulien, but not to her son Eudo or her daughter-in-law. Radulfus can neither condone nor condemn; Donata is her own penance. Ruald accepts the few facts he is told, finally realising how he mistreated his wife in his pursuit of the cloistered life.

Cadfael thinks long about it, saying "God's justice, if it makes no haste, makes no mistakes."

== Reception ==
The Potter's Field received positive reviews from Kirkus Reviews and Publishers Weekly.

== Setting ==
The story is set in Shrewsbury, Shropshire, at the Shrewsbury Abbey in the time of the Anarchy, when King Stephen, crowned king in 1135, was challenged in battles by his cousin, Empress Maud, who felt she had the true claim to the crown. By 1143, he had been held prisoner by her forces, and she had been besieged by his forces. He was traded, she escaped, to continue the struggle. The largest battles were past; King Stephen is now trying to take back one castle at a time. He was unprepared at Wilton, losing not only the fictional Eudo Blount's life, but also his important ally and royal steward William Martel, taken prisoner. Martel led the heroic rear guard action that allowed the King to escape with his own life. King Stephen ransomed Martel by turning Sherborne Castle over to Robert of Gloucester, a high price. Some sources give the date of that battle, the rout of Wilton, as 1 July 1143. Records are not clear, except that it happened after the end of 1142, in the first half of 1143. In the novel, the battle is said to occur in March. (Note: "When he brought back your lord's body for burial, in March," (Hugh Beringar speaking to the dowager lady Donata))

Geoffrey de Mandeville was made Earl of Essex by King Stephen, and held several castles as gift from Empress Maud in her brief time of ascendancy. King Stephen arrested him for treason in 1143, forcing him to turn over those castles to the King as the price of his freedom. This was done. Once set free, this powerful baron began a vicious rebellion in the Fens laying waste to the countryside, attacking Cambridge, and taking over of the Ramsey Abbey monastery as his headquarters in the Fens of the River Great Ouse as described in the novel. No one was safe from the continuous attacks and thieving. Some would credit the name given to the era of dispute between King Stephen and Empress Maud as the Anarchy, to this rebellion of Geoffrey de Mandeville, one who changed his coat often, and was so reckless in East Anglia.

Abbot Walter excommunicated Geoffrey de Mandeville for his abuse of the churchmen and the cloister. Other sources indicate that Walter went to Rome when Geoffrey de Mandeville took over Ramsey, soon followed by a competitor for the role of Abbot, Daniel. The pope then excommunicated de Mandeville, who cared naught for it. In that account, Walter returned while de Mandeville was still in possession of the property. After de Mandeville died, Walter resumed the full duties of Abbot. Another source suggests that Geoffrey de Mandeville took sides between Daniel and Walter, motivating him to take over Ramsey Abbey for Daniel.

The way that Donata and Generys used to settle their claims to the same man relies on a medieval concept called the wheel of fate.

The trek by the character Sulien Blount from the Ramsey Abbey in the area known as the Fens all the way to Shrewsbury Abbey mentioned real locations along the way, like Peterborough where Sulien stopped for a safe rest at a silversmith's. The distance by modern roads is about 130 miles; the fictional character walked for seven days. Walking, he avoided looking like a wealthy target on horseback for the marauding forces of Geoffrey de Mandeville, successfully carrying the news of the attacks as he travelled.

Longner Manor, the home of the Blount family, is not far from Shrewsbury with one crossing of the River Severn, shown best on this map of the area near Shrewsbury.

== Title ==
A potter's field is one filled with clay suitable for making pottery. Usually, the field is not good for agriculture. Thus it can be a place for a burial ground for the poor people, unknowns, or otherwise not allowed in the local cemetery. The phrase was first written in 1777, based on a reference in the Christian Bible (Matthew Chapter 27 verse 7).

The field that yields the body of an unknown woman in this story has a mix of soils. Just a small part was stripped for making pots. The rest was good for agriculture, allowing the discovery that sets the plot in motion.

== Continuity ==
Nigel Aspley is part of the force of armed men taken by Hugh Beringar to aid King Stephen in the Fens. In The Devil's Novice, Nigel had veered to the side of the Empress in hopes of gain, but stayed at the family manor with his new wife, when he was injured three years earlier. This is his first opportunity to show he has changed his ways.

== Publication history ==
Four hardback editions in English have been published, beginning in September 1989, through October 1991 (Publisher G K Hall & Co ISBN 0-8161-5194-6 / ISBN 978-0-8161-5194-3 USA edition). Eight paperback edition were issued, beginning in March 1990. The latest was in August 1998 by Sphere ISBN 0-7515-2733-5 / ISBN 978-0-7515-2733-9 (UK edition).

Four audio cassette editions are listed at Fantastic Fiction. The first was in May 1994, read by Sir Derek Jacobi, published by HarperCollins ISBN 0-00-104782-5 / ISBN 978-0-00-104782-2 (UK edition). The most recent was in 1997 by Recorded Books, LLC ISBN 0-7887-1089-3 / ISBN 978-0-7887-1089-6 (USA edition). More recently, Audio Partners issued an audio edition read by Stephen Thorne on 6 January 2003 ISBN 978-1-57270-298-1.

The novel has been translated and published in French, Italian, Dutch, German, and Polish.

- French: Le champ du potier (Paperback), Published 1993 by Éditions 10/18, 283 pages, Serge Chwat (Translator) ISBN 978-2-264-01798-7
- Italian: La missione di fratello Cadfael [The mission of Brother Cadfael], Published 1 January 2001 by Longanesi 2, Hardcover, 224 pages, Elsa Pelitti (Translator), ISBN 978-88-304-1844-8
- Dutch: Een zijden haar (Paperback), Published 1992 by De Boekerij, 211 pages, Pieter Janssens (Translator), ISBN 978-90-225-1271-5
- German: Bruder Cadfael und das Geheimnis der schönen Toten [Brother Cadfael and the mystery of the beautiful dead] (Paperback), Published 1 February 1995 by Heyne, 302 pages ISBN 978-3-453-08266-3
- Polish: Pole Garncarza, Published 2009 by Zysk i S-ka Wydawnictwo, 284 pages, ISBN 978-83-7506-366-0

Editions in Spanish, Russian and Korean are found in WorldCat holdings.

- Spanish: El Campo del alfarero, María Antonia Menini (Translator), Publisher Grupo Editorial Random House Mondadori Debolsillo (paperback), Barcelona 2002 ISBN 84-9759-175-5, ISBN 978-84-9759-175-1
- Russian: Смерть На Земле Горшечника [The death on the potter's field] /Smert' nazemle gorshechnika, Publisher S.n., Amfora, 2006 OCLC 152583806 ISBN 5-94278-991-6
- Korean: 욕망의땅 : 엘리스피터스장편소설 /Yongmang ŭi ttang : Ellisŭ P'it'ŏsŭ changp'yŏn sosŏl, Publisher 북하우스, Sŏul-si Buk Hausŭ, 2001 ISBN 89-87871-94-0, ISBN 978-89-87871-94-3

== Television adaptation ==
The Potter's Field was adapted into a television program as part of the Brother Cadfael series by Carlton Media, Central and WGBH Boston for ITV. It was filmed on location in Hungary and starred Sir Derek Jacobi as Cadfael.

The resulting episode was the second episode of the fourth series.
