= A Rare Benedictine: The Advent of Brother Cadfael =

1988 short stories by Ellis Peters

- First edition
- Author: Ellis Peters
- Series: Brother Cadfael
- Genre: Mystery novel
- Publisher: Headline
- Publication date: 1988
- English publication date: September 1988
- Media type: Print (Hardcover, Paperback)
- ISBN: 978-0747200765

A Rare Benedictine: The Advent of Brother Cadfael is a collection of three short stories by Ellis Peters, featuring her medieval detective, Brother Cadfael, first published in 1988.

In her foreword to the collection, Peters stated that, after introducing Cadfael in her novel A Morbid Taste for Bones, she was not interested in writing a novel depicting him during the pre-monastic phase of his life (i.e., during his adventures in The Holy Land as a crusader and sea captain), but did want to provide a brief look at how he came to renounce his former life and become a monk.

== Plot Summaries ==
=== A Light on the Road to Woodstock ===
In 1120, King Henry's force is returning in triumph to England, having secured control of Normandy once again. Cadfael, an experienced man-at-arms in the service of Roger Maduit, one of Henry's knights, accompanies his lord back to England, at a loss to decide what to do with his life once his term of service with Roger expires in a few days.

Cadfael's last duty is to help escort Roger to Woodstock, where Henry is holding court, to defend a lawsuit against the Benedictines of Shrewsbury Abbey, which claims to have been granted land by Roger's father. Roger's young wife slyly suggests that all he need do to ensure the outcome of the suit is to waylay the Abbey's representative on the road to Woodstock and keep him incommunicado for a day or two. With no one present to speak for the Abbey, it will lose by default judgment.

Cadfael is not privy to this plan, but, as Roger and a few select men are returning to their lodgings at night after kidnapping the Abbey's Prior, Roger is ambushed and nearly stabbed to death with a dagger, before Cadfael saves his life. Roger presumes the would-be assassin to be one of the Prior's escorts, in an over-zealous attempt to protect his master.

However, the hearing of the lawsuit is unexpectedly delayed, when disastrous news arrives of the wreck of the White Ship off Barfleur, resulting in the loss, in one fell swoop, of Prince William and most of the King's other likely successors. During the delay, Cadfael re-traces Roger's steps and discreetly rescues Prior Heribert from his confinement. When the King's Courts resume business three days later, Roger is stunned when Heribert appears, presenting sufficient proofs to gain judgment for the Abbey.

Roger is furious at Cadfael's "disloyalty," but Cadfael leaves him with a warning: he learned from Heribert that none of the Abbey's servants were armed; meaning the would-be assassin could only have been one of Roger's own men – likely the handsome young squire, conspiring with Roger's young wife, Lady Eadwina, to murder him. Roger, suddenly in terror over the long journey home, begs Cadfael to remain with him as the only man he can trust, but Cadfael says his term of service with Roger is over.

Approaching Prior Heribert before his party's return to Shrewsbury, Cadfael lays aside his arms and asks that he be allowed to go back with them.

=== The Price of Light ===
Hamo FitzHamon, Lord of the Manor, in his later years became concerned with securing spiritual benefits for his soul. Instead of pursuing charitable works for the poor, he chose to make a substantial donation to Shrewsbury Abbey. His gift consisted of a pair of silver candlesticks for St. Mary’s Altar, along with funds to support the continuous lighting of the altar.

Hamo and a small party visit the Abbey for the formal bestowal of the gift, which are received with mixed feelings. While the candlesticks are undoubtedly exquisite, the Abbey's almoner laments that he would rather receive their value in cash, to help provide for the many poor sheltering in the Abbey, many of whom may die in the coming winter for lack of food or proper clothing.

Hamo's young wife asks Cadfael, the Abbey's herbalist for a sleeping draught to help her rest. Later that evening, Cadfael comes back to his workshop and overhears the lady in dalliance with one of her husband's servants, indicating that she drugged her husband into slumber.

In the morning, the candlesticks have disappeared from the altar, and a search of the Abbey fails to locate them. Hamo is livid, promising bloody retribution on the thief when he is caught. Cadfael, through patient investigation, finds the candlesticks hidden in a sack of lavender flowers in his own workshop, and identifies the thief as Lady FitzHamon's maidservant, Elfgiva. He confronts her in secret, and she says that the only theft committed was by Hamo: he commissioned the candlesticks from his villein, Elfgiva's fiancé Alard, promising him his freedom in return. But when Alard completed his craft, Hamo reneged and sent Alard to do manual labour on one of his estates. Alard escaped a year ago, and within three days Hamo will be unable to reclaim him by law. Elfgiva has been awaiting her own chance to run and reunite with him. She pledges that if she finds him, she will convince him to sell the candlesticks and donate the proceeds to the Abbey.

Fully in sympathy with Elfgiva and Alard, Cadfael allows her to disappear from the Abbey with the candlesticks. Hamo is enraged, believing her to be the thief of the candlesticks, but Lady FitzHamon (after a word in her ear from Cadfael) realises that Elfgiva could expose her infidelity on the night of the theft, and quickly speaks up and says Elfgiva was attending her in her bedchamber that night.

A few days after a disgruntled Hamo departs, the almoner is ecstatic to find a basket dropped anonymously at the Abbey gate, filled with enough gold coins to provide for those most in need during the winter.

=== Eye Witness ===
The Abbey's lay steward, William Rede, makes his rounds of the Abbey's tenants, collecting the annual rents, but is hit over the head and dumped into the river on his way back to the Abbey. Although William is rescued before he can drown, his purse of rent money is stolen.

When he recovers consciousness, he says he cannot identify his assailant. However, Cadfael examines the place of the assault and remembers that a beggar, Rhodri, is allowed to sleep in a loft overlooking the spot. With the help of the local Sheriff's sergeant, Cadfael spreads the word that Rhodri witnessed the attack and will be questioned about the identity of the thief the following morning.

That evening, Cadfael, the sergeant, and William's young son are lying in wait in the loft, and ambush the thief and would-be murderer, who turns out to be William's innocent-looking apprentice clerk. Cadfael confides that the clerk, had he possessed Cadfael's local knowledge of Shrewsbury and its people, might have spared himself the trouble, since Rhodri was born blind!

== Historical background ==
The first story takes place in 1120. The wreck of the White Ship, and the loss of Henry I of England's male heir, leaving his daughter Maud as his only surviving legitimate child, leads to the dynastic conflict, and the civil war that forms the background for the events of the main series.

== Publication history ==
This collection was issued in three hardback editions. After the first edition in the UK, Mysterious Press issued an edition in the US in November 1989, ISBN 0892963972 / 9780892963973. One year later, Ulverscroft Large Print issued large print in the UK, ISBN 0708923259 / 9780708923252.

Four paperback editions came out from September 1989 to April 2006. The most recent edition is from Headline Review, ISBN 075533079X / 9780755330799 (UK edition). There are five audio editions, the first in November 1994. The most recent was issued on CD in December 2005 by Hodder & Stoughton ISBN 1844561216 / 9781844561216 (UK edition). A Kindle edition was published in July 2013, ISBN B00DYV1XMQ. A Kindle edition was released in July 2013, ISBN B00DYV1XMQ.

Editions in French and Dutch are noted on Goodreads.

- French: Un bénédictin pas ordinaire (Frère Cadfael, #21), Published 2001 by 10/18, Mass Market Paperback, ISBN 9782264033451
- Dutch: Een bijzondere benedictijn, Paperback Published 1992 by De Boekerij, 123 pages, Pieter Janssens (Translator), ISBN 9789022513606
