= Walter Durdent =

12th-century Bishop of Coventry

- Bishop of Coventry
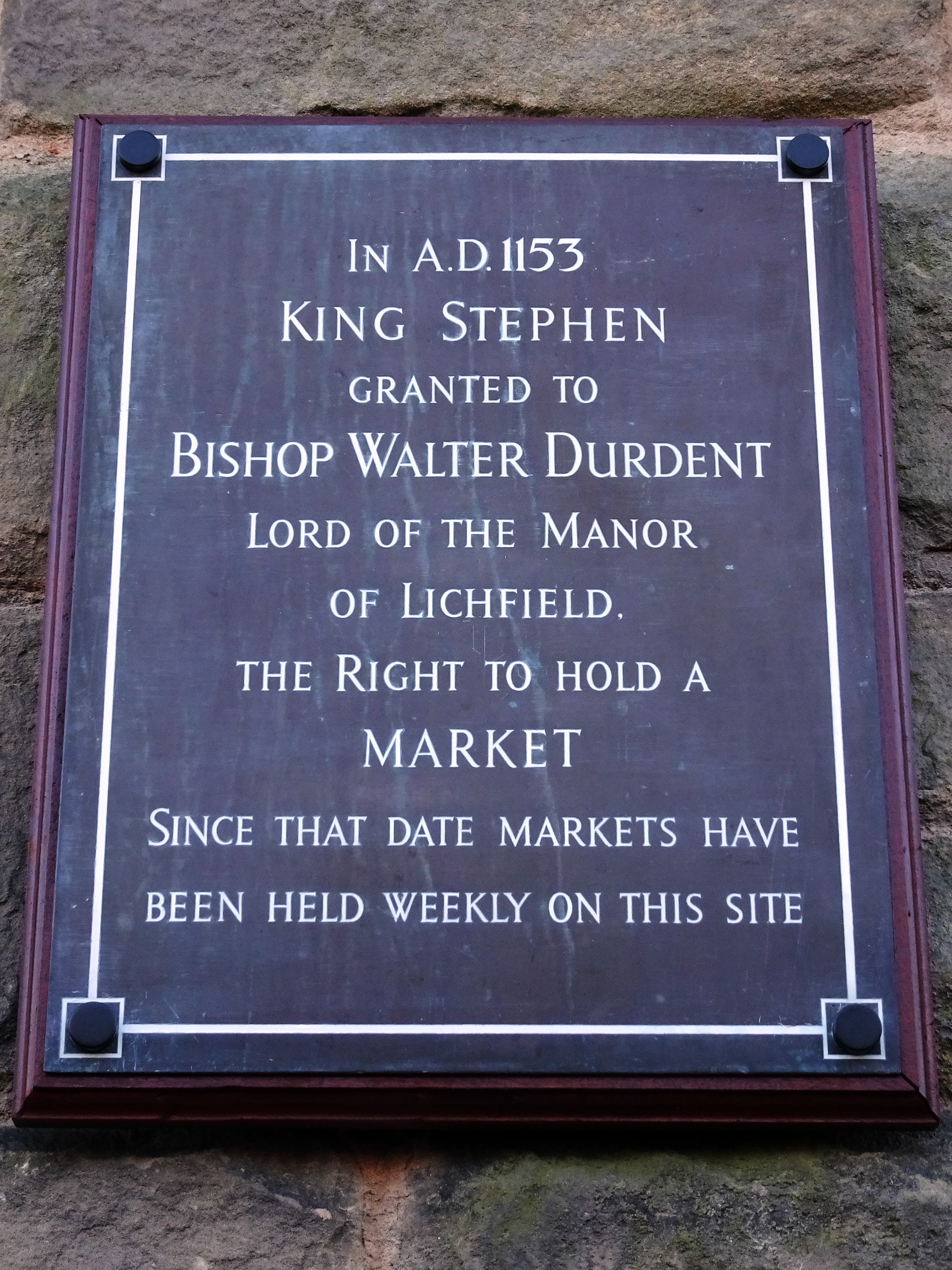
- Appointed: between April 1148 - October 1149
- Term ended: 7 December 1159
- Predecessor: Roger de Clinton
- Successor: Richard Peche
- Other posts: Prior of Christ Church Priory, Canterbury

Orders
- Consecration: 2 October 1149

Personal details
- Died: 7 December 1159
- Denomination: Catholic

Walter Durdent (died 1159) was Bishop of Coventry from 1149 to 1159.

Durdent was a Benedictine monk before his elevation to the episcopate. He was prior of Christ Church Priory in Canterbury when he was elected to Coventry through the influence of Archbishop Theobald of Canterbury. Walter was consecrated as Bishop of Coventry on 2 October 1149. He was considered an excellent theologian. During his time as bishop, he forbade the practice of selling the chrism used in various ecclesiastical rituals.

Durdent died 7 December 1159.

== Citations ==
Catholic Church titles
Preceded by Roger de Clinton	Bishop of Coventry; 1149–1159	Succeeded by Richard Peche
