= Richard Peche =

12th-century Bishop of Coventry

Robert Peche
- Bishop of Lichfield
- Appointed: before April 1161
- Term ended: resigned 1182
- Predecessor: Walter Durdent
- Successor: Gerard la Pucelle

Orders
- Consecration: about 18 April 1161

Personal details
- Died: 6 October 1182
- Denomination: Catholic

Richard Peche (died 1182) was a medieval Bishop of Lichfield.

Peche was probably the son of Robert Peche who was Bishop of Lichfield from 1121 to 1128. He was definitely the son of a priest, as Ralph de Diceto wrote about him and justified the elevation of a son of a priest to the episcopacy. He was Archdeacon of Coventry, and may have been given that office by his father, although the first record of him as an archdeacon is from about 1140.

Peche was consecrated as bishop about 18 April 1161, either by Archbishop Theobald of Canterbury or by Walter, Bishop of Rochester. Richard probably assisted Roger de Pont L'Evêque the Archbishop of York in the coronation of Henry the Young King in 1170. After Becket's death, Richard, along with Bartholomew Iscanus the Bishop of Exeter reconciled Canterbury Cathedral so it might be once more used for the liturgy. While bishop, Richard worked to restore the finances of the diocese, and ten charters he issued are still extant. He was also briefly joint viceroy of Ireland with John, Constable of Chester.

Peche resigned the see in 1182, died on 6 October 1182 and was buried at St Thomas' church, Stafford. After his resignation, he took the habit of an Augustinian canon at Stafford, although the story that he founded the house he retired has since been proven to be not the case.

== Citations ==
Catholic Church titles
Preceded by Walter Durdent	Bishop of Coventry; 1161–1182	Succeeded by Gerard la Pucelle
