= The Devil's Novice =

1983 novel by Ellis Peters

- First edition
- Author: Ellis Peters
- Series: The Cadfael Chronicles
- Genre: Mystery novel
- Publisher: Macmillan
- Publication date: 1983
- Media type: Print (Hardcover, Paperback) & audio book
- Pages: 192
- ISBN: 0-333-35170-3
- OCLC: 12585570
- Preceded by: The Sanctuary Sparrow
- Followed by: Dead Man's Ransom

The Devil's Novice is a medieval mystery novel by Ellis Peters, set in autumn 1140. It is the eighth novel in the Cadfael Chronicles, first published in 1983.

It is the Anarchy, when Empress Maud's forces are rising, King Stephen is strengthening ties with needed allies, and lords of manors must choose a side. A sturdy younger son of a local manor arrives at the Abbey at Shrewsbury, to be a novice. Brother Cadfael and Abbot Radulfus must work to understand why this troubled young man thinks he is fit to be a monk.

It was adapted for television in 1996 by Central for ITV.

== Plot summary ==
In mid September 1140, Meriet Aspley, the younger son of Leoric Aspley, the lord of Aspley manor, enters the Abbey of Saint Peter and Saint Paul, petitioning to become a monk. In October, he has nightmares during which he speaks aloud, waking the entire dortoir. The superstitious novices whisper that he is possessed, and they nickname him "The Devil's Novice."

The Abbey receives a visit from Canon Eluard, an emissary of Bishop Henry of Winchester, who comes to inquire after Peter Clemence, a young cleric in the bishop's household, who has not returned from a diplomatic mission to Chester. Because Clemence was last seen as a guest at Aspley Manor, Eluard questions Meriet, who had tended the guest's horse at the manor. The following morning, Leoric had ridden the first mile out with his guest, who was on his way to Whitchurch for his next night's lodging.

After completing the mission that had been assigned to Clemence, Eluard rides on to urge King Stephen to visit Ranulf, Earl of Chester, and his brother, William of Roumare, at Lincoln, which suggestion is taken up. Sheriff Prestcote travels with King Stephen, leaving Hugh Beringar in charge. Armed with Meriet's description, Beringar finds Clemence's horse and returns it to the Abbey stables. The next morning, Meriet identifies the horse for Beringar, telling the horse's name, Barbary, same name he cried in his sleep. Brother Jerome is officious. Meriet jumps on Jerome and nearly strangles him, before Cadfael restrains him. Meriet is punished by being whipped and kept ten days in a punishment cell.

Cadfael visits Aspley Manor. He meets Meriet's family and neighbours: his favoured elder brother, Nigel; Nigel's betrothed, Roswitha Linde, beautiful and flirtatious; Roswitha's twin brother Janyn, an easygoing man and Nigel's best friend; and Leoric's ward, Isouda Foriet. Leoric sheds no light on Meriet's wish to take orders. As he leaves, Cadfael meets Isouda Foriet, who provides some useful details about Clemence's visit. He also learns that Meriet is in love with his brother's fiancée. But Isouda loves Meriet and intends to have him for her own, declaring that Meriet's attachment is a passing fancy, for, she says, Roswitha loves Nigel. The pair will marry before Christmas, then live at Leoric Aspley's manor near Newark.

Back at the abbey, Cadfael shares two secrets with Meriet: that he, Cadfael, is a father, and that Meriet is assigned to help Brother Mark, at Saint Giles, the lazar house maintained by the Abbey, after his confinement. Cadfael and Hugh Beringar plumb the possible connections between two events now linked only by time: the disappearance of Clemence and the appearance of Meriet at the monastery. On a dry 3 December, Brother Mark and Meriet set out to gather firewood with the St. Giles lepers. Meriet leads them to a clearing where for years charcoal had been made. In one of the wood stacks, they discover a charred skeleton. The remains are carefully brought to the Abbey by Hugh's men.

A sergeant brings in a half-starved man living wild in the forest. Harald is a runaway villein farrier from a manor to the south. He found Clemence's dagger in the forest. Serving two purposes, Beringar lets it be known that Harald is taken for the murder of Clemence. After Meriet hears this rumour, he walks in his sleep, taking a serious fall. On waking, Meriet confesses to the killing to free the innocent man. Brother Mark asks Meriet to confess to his priest, but Meriet refuses. Thus, Brother Mark does not believe his guilt. Meriet tells Hugh Beringar that he shot Clemence with an arrow after he left Aspley, because Clemence flirted too much with Roswitha. His father discovered him trying to hide the corpse, and he gave him a choice: to admit his guilt and be executed, or else give up the rest of his life for penance as a monk, thus saving the family honour. Neither Hugh nor Cadfael believe him guilty.

Eluard returns; he identifies the cross and ring as belonging to Clemence. Leoric Aspley comes to the Abbey for his son's marriage. Leoric tells Cadfael of finding Meriet with Clemence's body that afternoon. Leoric believed the scene before him. After Meriet agreed to join Shrewsbury Abbey, Leoric drove the horse away and burned Clemence's body in the wood stack. Cadfael points out that Meriet must be shielding someone else. Leoric refuses to believe it is Nigel. Cadfael explains one flaw in the father's assumptions: the time of the death. Clemence was found only a few miles from Aspley, and thus killed in the morning.

Isouda visits Meriet at his room in Saint Giles. She rejoins Cadfael to return to the Abbey, discussing how to undercut Meriet's false confession. "'Girl,' said Cadfael, breathing in deeply, 'you terrify me like an act of God. And I do believe you will pull down the thunderbolt.'" Isouda and Roswitha make final preparations for the wedding next day. Isouda chances on an antique brooch in Roswitha's possession. Isouda saw the same one on Clemence's cloak at Aspley Manor. She meets Cadfael to report her thunderbolt to him; he realises the importance of the brooch being intact, unburnt. She arranges for two horses to bring Brother Mark and Meriet to the Abbey, to witness his brother's marriage.

Isouda puts the brooch on Roswitha's cloak. After the couple are married, they walk out into the gateway. Canon Eluard instantly recognises the brooch as a gift from the bishop to his late clerk. When he asks where Roswitha got it, she lies, a lie that Leoric challenges publicly. She admits that her brother Janyn gave it to her. Janyn has already fled the Abbey on one of Isouda's horses. As Beringar prepares to pursue him, a messenger from King Stephen arrives, ordering the local knight-service to muster immediately; the two Earls of Chester and Lincoln have declared their independence from either side in the civil war and have set up their own kingdom in the north, taking Lincoln Castle. Nigel has fled the grounds, taking Isouda's other horse.

Beringar's sergeants pursue them. In the woods near Stafford, Nigel catches up with Janyn, whose horse has been lamed. Nigel offers to carry them both on his horse. Janyn stabs Nigel, steals his horse and rides on. The Sheriff's men come upon Nigel ten minutes later and return him to the Abbey. Nigel and Janyn were offered castles and commands by William of Rumare on their summer visit to the northern manor. Clemence shared his mission with these distant relations. Clemence would have stumbled on a meeting of the Earls and their allies. Nigel proposed to send word ahead, but Janyn shot Clemence down in the forest. When Nigel learned this, he went to the forest to bury the body. Meriet discovered him, and he heard their father's hounds approaching. He told his brother to run, knowing that Leoric would be heartbroken if Nigel were blamed, but unaffected if Meriet was.

Nigel repents of his treason while healing from his wound. Beringar expects him to join the King's army, marching north to confront the rebels. Meriet and the villein Harald are both absolved of guilt. Harald is found a farrier job in town, where he will be safe if he stays a year and a day. Only now does Leoric see the similarity of himself and Meriet. He confesses his sins to Abbot Radulfus, and asks him for two additional favours: first, that Leoric be allowed to sponsor Brother Mark, who has been a true friend to Meriet, in his studies for the priesthood; and second, that the Abbot witness a new will that leaves his manor to Meriet. With Janyn gone, Nigel will inherit the Linde manor through his wife. Leoric begs Meriet's forgiveness, and the two reconcile. Roswitha's lies broke the charm for Meriet. Isouda gained his affections, now he shed his monk's habit. When he parts from Brother Cadfael, Meriet explains how the term 'Brother' came hard to his lips in their conversations, as he wished to call him father. Cadfael accepted that from son Meriet.

== Characters ==
- Brother Cadfael: Herbalist monk at the Benedictine Abbey at Shrewsbury, with a talent for finding the truth of a problem. He is 60 years old, having joined this monastery about 17 years earlier, after a life 'in the world' as man at arms, sailor, Crusader, and lover of a few women. He is godfather to Giles Beringar, son of Hugh and Aline. In terms of the monastery, he is a conversus, in contrast to those men who entered as children, termed oblatus.
- Abbot Radulfus: Head of the Benedictine Abbey of St Peter and St Paul at Shrewsbury, a wise, calm but forceful man. Based on the real abbot of that time. In this story, he decides the monastery will no longer accept small boys as future monks; they will be accepted only for schooling.
- Brother Jerome: Confessor of the novices at the Abbey. He is a man who loves the sound of his own voice, and is a stickler for rules.
- Brother Paul: He is the monk in charge of the novices and pupils at the Abbey, including the newest, Meriet.
- Brother Mark: Young monk at the lazar house of Saint Giles. He is a quiet, self-effacing man with deep internal strength. He was helper to Cadfael in the herbarium, and is much loved by Cadfael. He is of slight build from a rough childhood, about 20 years old. He was introduced in Monk's Hood.
- Leoric Aspley: Lord of nearby Aspley manor. He is recently widowed, a man of honour, stern and decisive, of Saxon blood, who married a woman of Norman heritage, Avota. He is a generous supporter of the Abbey. He owns a second manor a ways north, which his elder son will manage upon his marriage.
- Nigel Aspley: Elder son of Leoric and Avota. He is about 25 years old, tall and handsome, promised in marriage to Roswitha Linde, and much in love with her. He is the eldest of the five young people on three adjacent manors who grew up together.
- Meriet Aspley: Younger son of Leoric and Avota. He is 19 years old, strong and active, but not as tall as his father. Accompanied by his father, he presents himself to be a monk at the Abbey, parting from his father very formally. He is a troubled young man, but trustworthy.
- Wulfric Linde: Neighbor to Leoric Aspley. He has a manor, is widowed and father of twins.
- Roswitha Linde: Daughter of Wulfric. She is beautiful and flirtatious, engaged to marry Nigel Aspley since birth but also in love with him. Like her brother, she has red-gold hair.
- Janyn Linde: Twin brother of Roswitha. He is easy and charming, not yet interested in marriage himself. He is about 22 years old.
- Isouda Foriet: Orphan and ward of Leoric Aspley. He manages her manors until she is of age. She is 16 years old, charming and outspoken, growing rapidly to womanhood, and quite fond of Meriet Aspley.
- Gilbert Prestcote: Sheriff of Shropshire, in King Stephen's service. He is away with the King for the duration of this story. Introduced in One Corpse Too Many.
- Hugh Beringar: Deputy Sheriff of Shropshire. He is about 25 years old in this story. He is a close friend to the older man Cadfael and married to Aline. He is father of baby Giles, who passes his first birthday in this story. Hugh was introduced in One Corpse Too Many.
- Canon Eluard: Priest in service to the Bishop of Winchester, Henry of Blois (brother to King Stephen). He is termed a 'black canon', meaning he followed the Augustinian rule. He came to Shrewsbury tracing Peter Clemence, the messenger first sent on the errand of diplomacy that Eluard completed. As the Bishop is working out of England for a short while, Eluard is the primary man on staff working to negotiate alliances toward peace.
- Peter Clemence: Young priest of a courtly manner, a clerk to the Bishop of Winchester, distant kin to the late Avota Aspley. His failure to return to Winchester is announced in Shrewsbury by Canon Eluard.
- Harald: Farrier and villein to a man near Gretton. He is now living wild in the Long Forest near Shrewsbury because he failed to kill his lord's steward in revenge for raping his sister, thus ran away.

== Continuity ==
- The ending of the novel sets up the Battle of Lincoln that opens the following novel, Dead Man's Ransom, in which an army under Stephen marches north to confront the rebellious barons, only to have them surrender and then be confronted by an army from the Empress Maud.
- Cadfael reflects that Hugh Beringar, on his way north, will prefer that Janyn is captured or killed in the coming battle, but the subsequent novel does not make clear whether this happens. Hugh expects Nigel to take up arms for the King, which he did in The Potter's Field, in late 1143, when the King asked for aid in putting down Geoffrey de Mandeville.
- In his suggestion to send Meriet to St. Giles, Cadfael says Brother Mark needs a new person in his care, as the orphan boy Bran has lately been taken in by Joscelin and Iveta Lucy. Iveta de Massard was spared a forced marriage one year earlier in The Leper of Saint Giles, and Joscelin was freed of any suspicions of murder. Joscelin had become close to young Bran in his stay at Saint Giles. This closes their story.

== Critical reception ==
Kirkus Reviews wrote that it would be popular with those who were fans of Peter's storytelling and character writing.

== Setting in history ==
This novel is set during the Anarchy, a period of English history where the crown was held by King Stephen but challenged by his cousin Empress Maud, the only surviving legitimate child of Henry I. Empress Maud lived in Anjou with her husband and children at the time King Henry died in 1135. She did not come to England to fight actively for her claim (oaths her father had asked the nobles to swear before he died) until the end of September 1139, when active battles increased between the forces on each side, a year before this story begins.

At this time in 1140, some of the more powerful barons, like Ranulf, Earl of Chester and his half-brother William of Roumare, did not take a side, preferring to work on increasing their own lands and power, while sometimes keeping order in their own domain. The earldom of Lincoln and Lincoln Castle are in play; eventually William of Roumare will have it, but not for several years (1143) and after sieges and captures, though the author has him given the title in 1140. The church officials in England were aiming to settle the dispute, to stop the chaos of battle or disorder across England. Stephen's younger brother, Henry of Blois, was bishop of Winchester, a Cluniac monk, and the papal legate of England, making him a powerful churchman in England; he was also wealthy by inheritance. Stephen had offended some powers in the church (e.g., he seized the castles of Nigel, the bishop of Ely); his brother attempted to soothe those problems as well, at a peace conference at Bath that ultimately failed.

Ranulf of Chester did act opposite to his agreement with the King, in such a short time span. The King reacted in force and immediately to what was treason to him. The battle of Lincoln succeeds in the eventful year of 1141.

The story is set in real places, including Shrewsbury Abbey and the city of Shrewsbury, mentioning events taking place in Winchester where Stephen called his lords and sheriffs together at Michaelmas for reckoning of rents and updates on status of his allies. The priest headed to Whitchurch after leaving the Aspley manor, a market town of Shropshire, about 20 to 25 miles on modern roads from Shrewsbury. Leoric Aspley's second manor is near Newark, over 100 miles northeast on modern roads from Shrewsbury and in the vicinity of Lincoln, an area where allegiances were not yet settled between King and Empress. The two friends met outside Stafford, some 40 miles from Shrewsbury on modern roads, on the way to Lincoln.

== Publication history ==
Fantastic Fiction shows the first UK publication by MacMillan on 18 August 1983.

It has been issued on CD in English, as well, and is available as an e-book. Fantastic Fiction lists English language editions: 4 audio cassette and 3 audio CD issued from 1993 to February 2013 (ISBN 1433265117 / 9781433265112, Publisher Blackstone Audiobooks); 9 paperbacks from December 1985 to April 2012; 5 hardback editions from August 1983 to July 2000.

Goodreads lists 28 editions of The Devil's Novice in English, Italian, French, Portuguese, Swedish, German, Dutch. (Galician is no longer in its list.) It is in multiple formats (hardcover, paperback, large print, audio cassette).

- Italian: Il novizio del diavolo, Published 1994 by TEA Mass Market Paperback, 236 pages, Author(s) Ellis Peters, Monica Zardoni (Translator), ISBN 9788878196902)
- French: L'apprenti du diable, Published 17 July 2005 by V.G.E., 253 pages, Author(s) Ellis Peters ISBN 9782264015242)
- Portuguese: O Noviço do Diabo, Published 2008 by Record, 236 pages, Author(s) Ellis Peters ISBN 8501039799
- Swedish: Djävulens novis (Broder Cadfael #8), 223 pages, Author(s) Ellis Peters
- German: Des Teufels Novize (Bruder Cadfael, #8), Published 1988 by Heyne Deutsche Erstausgabe, Paperback, 254 pages, Author(s) Ellis Peters ISBN 9783453025660)
- Dutch: De duivelse droom, Published 1989 by De Boekerij, Paperback, 202 pages, Author(s) Ellis Peters, Pieter Janssens (Translator) ISBN 9789022509364)

== Television adaptation ==
The book was adapted for television by Central Television for ITV, starring Derek Jacobi as Cadfael, Christien Anholt as Meriet, and Julian Glover as Leoric. It was shown as Season 2, Episode 2 in 1996.

The TV adaptation is largely faithful to the book, with a few changes:

- Some proper names are changed to sound more modern: "Nigel" becomes Tristan (Patrick Toomey); "Roswitha" becomes Rosanna (Chloë Annett) and "Isouda" becomes Isobel (Louisa Milwood-Haigh); the name of Meriet's family and his father's manor is changed from "Aspley" to Ashby.
- There is an extended prologue showing Peter Clemence's (Ian Reddington) overnight stay at Ashby, where he alienates everyone with his arrogant and patronising manner, except Rosanna, who flirts with him shamelessly.
- Brother Mark's role in the novel is fulfilled by Cadfael's earnest assistant, Brother Oswin (Mark Charnock).
- Hugh Beringar (Eoin McCarthy) travels out of Shrewsbury, leaving his less-subtle deputy, Sergeant Warden (Albie Woodington), in charge, who repeatedly clashes with Cadfael over the solution to Clemence's murder. Under pressure from Canon Eluard (Ian McNeice), Warden is all too eager to condemn first Harald (John Dallimore), and then Meriet, for the crime.
- Janyn (Daniel Betts) is caught as he is trying to flee the Abbey, confesses, and is last seen being marched to gaol, to await execution.
