= Robert Peche =

12th-century Bishop of Coventry

- Bishop of Coventry
- Elected: c. January 1121
- Term ended: 22 August 1126
- Predecessor: Robert de Limesey
- Successor: Roger de Clinton

Orders
- Consecration: 13 March 1121

Personal details
- Died: 22 August 1126
- Denomination: Catholic

Robert Peche (died 1126) was a medieval Bishop of Coventry.

Peche was elected about January 1121, and consecrated on 13 March 1121. He died on 22 August 1126. Little is known of his background, and his actual activity while bishop remains obscure. It is probable that Richard Peche, who became bishop of Coventry from 1161 to 1182 was his son.

== Citations ==
Catholic Church titles
| Preceded by Robert de Limesey | Bishop of Coventry; 1121–1126 | Succeeded by Roger de Clinton |
