= Cadwaladr ap Gruffudd =

Gwynedd royal family member

Cadwaladr ap Gruffudd (c. 1100 – 1172) was the third son of Gruffudd ap Cynan, King of Gwynedd, and brother of Owain Gwynedd.

== Appearance in history ==
Cadwaladr first appears in the historical record in 1136, when following the killing of the lord of Ceredigion, Richard Fitz Gilbert de Clare, he accompanied his brother Owain Gwynedd in an invasion of Ceredigion. They captured five castles in the north of Ceredigion then later in the year launched a second invasion, inflicting a heavy defeat on the Normans at the Battle of Crug Mawr, just outside Cardigan. In 1137 they captured Carmarthen. He later married Richard Fitz Gilbert de Clare's daughter Alice (Adelize) de Clare and had issue with her.

Gruffudd ap Cynan died in 1137 and was succeeded by Owain Gwynedd, his eldest surviving son. Cadwaladr was given lands in northern Ceredigion. Cadwaladr joined with Ranulf de Gernon, 4th Earl of Chester in the attack on Lincoln in 1141, when King Stephen of England was taken prisoner. This alliance was probably linked to Cadwaladr's marriage to Alice de Clare, daughter of Richard Fitz Gilbert de Clare.

In 1143 Cadwaladr's men killed Anarawd ap Gruffudd of Deheubarth by treachery, apparently on Cadwaladr's orders. Owain Gwynedd responded by sending his son Hywel ab Owain Gwynedd to deprive Cadwaladr of his lands in Ceredigion. Cadwaladr fled to Ireland where he hired a fleet from Óttar, the Norse-Gael king of Dublin, and landed at Abermenai in 1144 in an attempt to force Owain to return his lands. Cadwaladr apparently abandoned or escaped from his allies and made peace with his brother, who obliged the Dubliners to leave.

In 1147 Hywel ab Owain Gwynedd and his brother Cynan drove Cadwaladr from his remaining lands in Meirionnydd. A further quarrel with his brother Owain led to Cadwaladr being driven into exile in England, where King Henry II later gave him lands at Ness in Shropshire.

== Henry II's time ==
When Henry II invaded Gwynedd in 1157 the terms of the peace agreement between him and Owain Gwynedd included the stipulation that Cadwaladr should be given back his lands. From this time on, Cadwaladr was careful to cooperate closely with his brother, helping him to capture Rhuddlan and Prestatyn castles in 1167.

Cadwaladr survived his brother by two years, dying in 1172. He was buried alongside Owain in Bangor Cathedral.

== Children ==
Cadwaladr had seven sons with three different wives.

With his first wife, Gwerfel ferch Gwrgan, he had:

- Cadfan ap Cadwaladr

With his second wife, Alice de Clare, he had:

- Cunedda ap Cadwaladr
- Rhicert ap Cadwaladr
- Ralph ap Cadwaladr

With his third wife, Tangwystl, he had:

- Cadwgan ap Cadwaladr
- Maredudd ap Cadwaladr
- Cadwallon ap Cadwaladr

== Fiction ==
Cadwaladr's attempt to reclaim his lands with the help of a Danish fleet in 1144 forms the background to The Summer of the Danes by Ellis Peters in the Brother Cadfael series, as well The Good Knight, the first book in the Gareth and Gwen Medieval Mysteries by Sarah Woodbury.

== Notes ==
=== Sources ===
- Lloyd, John Edward (2004). A History of Wales: From the Norman Invasion to the Edwardian Conquest. Barnes & Noble. ISBN 978-0-7607-5241-8.
- White, Graeme J. (2016). "The Legacy of Ranulf de Gernons". In Dalton, Paul; Luscombe, David (eds.). Rulership and Rebellion in the Anglo-Norman World, C.1066–c.1216: Essays in Honour of Professor Edmund King. Routledge.
- John Burke, Sir Bernard Burke (1850) A genealogical and heraldic dictionary of the landed gentry of Great Britain. London: H. Colburn
- John Edward Lloyd (1911) The history of Wales from the earliest times to the Edwardian conquest (Longmans, Green & Co.)
- Woodbury, Sarah (Summer 2023). "Historical author fell in love with Wales after her first visit". Yr Enfys (Interview). Cymru A'r Byd (Wales International).
