= Roger de Clinton =

12th-century Bishop of Coventry

- Bishop of Coventry
- Appointed: October 1129
- Term ended: 16 April 1148
- Predecessor: Robert Peche
- Successor: Walter Durdent
- Other posts: Archdeacon, either of Buckingham or Lincoln

Orders
- Consecration: 22 December 1129

Personal details
- Died: 16 April 1148
- Denomination: Catholic

Roger de Clinton (died 1148) was a medieval Bishop of Coventry and Lichfield.

== Life ==
Clinton was the nephew of Geoffrey de Clinton, an advisor to King Henry I of England.

Clinton had been an archdeacon before his elevation to the episcopate, either of Buckingham (1119–1129) or of Lincoln (c.1129). Geoffrey de Clinton was said to have promised King Henry three thousand marks if the king would appoint Roger a bishop. Roger was nominated in October 1129, and consecrated on 22 December 1129. Roger was part of the deputation to the papal curia in 1139 that defended King Stephen of England against the charge of breaking his oath to the Empress Matilda. Another member of the delegation included Arnulf of Lisieux, who was an archdeacon at the time, but who presented the case. Roger also attended the Second Lateran Council in 1139. The Gesta Stephani claimed that Roger was heavily involved in military affairs during the reign of King Stephen.

Clinton died on 16 April 1148. Clinton was responsible for establishing Buildwas Abbey, a Cistercian house in Shropshire in 1135.

== Citations ==
Catholic Church titles
Preceded by Robert Peche	Bishop of Coventry; 1129–1148	Succeeded by Walter Durdent
