= Emma de Guader, Countess of Norfolk =

11th-century Countess of Norfolk

Emma de Guader

Countess of Norfolk, Lady of Gaël and Montfort (Seigneur de Gaël et Montfort).

Personal details
- Born: Emma de Breteuil c. 1059
- Died: 1099
- Spouse: Ralph de Gael
- Relations: William Fitz-Osbern (father); Adeliza de Tosny (mother)
- Children: William (Guillame) de Gael; Alain de Gael; Raoul II de Gael
- Occupation: Countess, crusader

Emma Fitz-Osborn or Emma de Breteuil, and later Emma de Guader (died after 1096), was a Norman noblewoman, the wife of Ralph de Guader and the daughter of William FitzOsbern, Lord of Breteuil and later first Earl of Hereford of a new creation, who was a cousin and close adviser of William the Conqueror. William's opposition to their marriage led to the unsuccessful Revolt of the Earls.

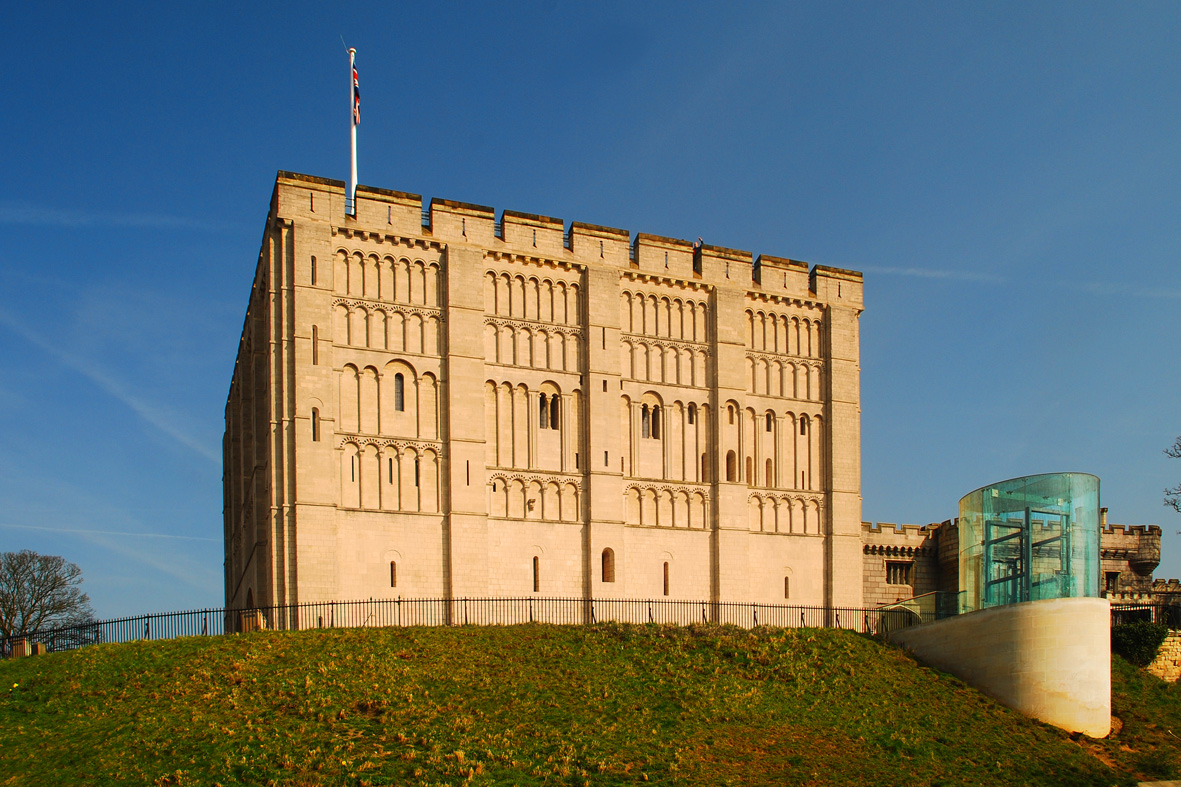
Norwich Castle keep, 2009

== Life ==
Emma was first named Emma de Breteuil, born to William Fitz-Osbern and his wife Adeliza, the daughter of Roger I of Tosny and his wife Adelaide (the daughter of Ermesinde of Carcassonne, regent-countess of Barcelona). She was born in or around 1059 in Breteuil in Normandy.

== Marriage ==
At Exning near Cambridge, at 1075 Emma married Ralph de Gael the Earl of East Anglia, after his father. King William is believed to have opposed the match. Some writers believe that William's opposition was possibly due to the fact that uniting two huge estates and royal lines could be perceived as a threat, noting that he had previously poisoned relatives that stood in his way to the throne.

== Defence of Norwich Castle ==
At the "brides ale" or wedding feast, Emma's brother and husband planned a rebellion against William the Conqueror but were betrayed. Her brother was captured and then imprisoned for many years by William but her husband escaped to Denmark to raise help. Others who had supported the rebellion were subjected to violence. Emma stayed to defend Norwich Castle which was besieged by William. Despite the odds against her, and those at the castle, she bravely refused to give in to the king's men. She organised the defense of the town for so long that William eventually had to compromise with her to restore peace. Part of the settlement included a safe passage for herself and her troops in exchange for her castle.

== Life in Brittany ==
The Countess left for Brittany, where she was joined by her husband. They lived in Brittany on their vast inherited estates, including the castles of Wader and Montfort. In 1076 there Ralph joined a rebellion against the Duke of Britanny and there was an unsuccessful siege of Dol castle. The couple had at least three children, and her son Raoul II inherited their estates.

== Crusades ==
Emma was an active participant in the First Crusade, which she joined in 1096 along with her husband and her son Alan; they served under Robert Curthose. Emma died some time after 1096 on the road to the Holy Land.

Emma's granddaughter Amice, the daughter of her son Raoul II, married Robert de Beaumont, 2nd Earl of Leicester.

== Bibliography ==
- Cathcart King, David James (1983), Castellarium Anglicanum: An Index and Bibliography of the Castles in England, Wales and the Islands. Volume II: Norfolk–Yorkshire and the Islands, London: Kraus International Publications, ISBN 0-527-50110-7
