= Revolt of the Earls =

1075 rebellion in medieval England against William the Conqueror

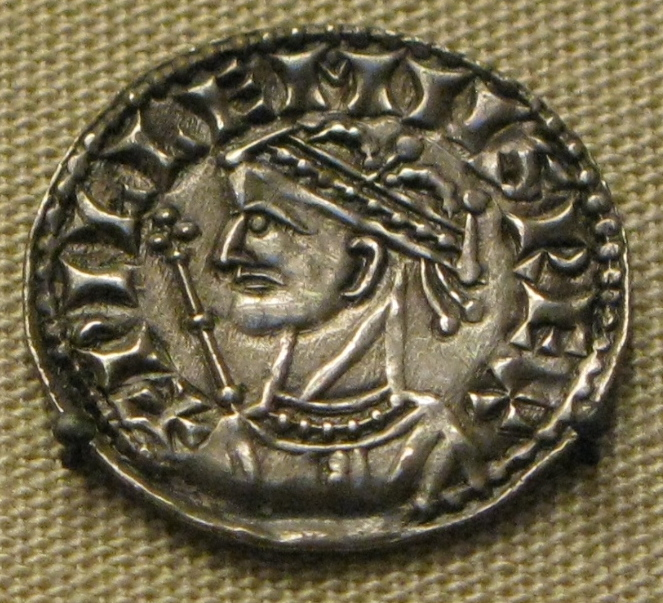
Silver coin of William the Conqueror

The Revolt of the Earls in 1075 was a rebellion of three earls against William I of England (William the Conqueror). It was the last serious act of resistance against William in the Norman Conquest.

== Cause ==
Although chroniclers disagree on this, the revolt may have been caused by the king's refusal (in his absence – he had been in Normandy since 1073) to sanction the marriage between Emma (daughter of William FitzOsbern, 1st Earl of Hereford and Adelissa de Tosny) and Ralph de Guader, Earl of East Anglia in 1075. They married at Exning in Suffolk and the wedding feast was where the plot was supposedly hatched.

Then, in William's absence, Ralph, Roger de Breteuil, 2nd Earl of Hereford (his new brother-in-law), and Waltheof, 1st Earl of Northumberland began the revolt; but it was plagued by disaster. Waltheof soon lost heart and confessed the conspiracy to Archbishop of Canterbury Lanfranc, who urged Earl Roger to return to his allegiance, and finally excommunicated him and his adherents. Waltheof then confessed the conspiracy to William in Normandy.

Roger, who was to bring his force from the west to join Ralph, was held in check at the River Severn by the Worcestershire fyrd which the English bishop Wulfstan brought into the field against him. Ralph in the meantime encountered a much superior force under the warrior bishops Odo of Bayeux and Geoffrey de Montbray (the latter ordered that all rebels should have their right foot cut off) near Cambridge and retreated hurriedly to Norwich, hotly pursued by the royal army. Leaving Emma to defend Norwich Castle, Ralph sailed for Denmark in search of help. He eventually returned to England with a fleet of 200 ships under Cnut and Hakon, but they failed to do anything effective.

Meanwhile, the Countess held out in Norwich until she obtained terms for herself and her followers, who were deprived of their lands, but were allowed forty days to leave the realm. The Countess retired to her estate in Brittany, where she was rejoined by her husband.

== Aftermath ==
William deprived Ralph of all his lands including his earldom, and expelled him from England, with Ralph retiring to his lands in Brittany, where he was later attacked by William. Brian of Brittany might also have been deposed after the revolt, with his lands given to William's half-brother Robert, Count of Mortain. Ralph's expulsion and Brian's loss of lands caused indignation among the Bretons in England, whom William attempted to placate by giving Ralph's lands in East Anglia to another Breton, Alan Rufus. In the next year William would unsuccessfully besiege Ralph in his castle in Dol.

Roger was also deprived of his lands and earldom, but unlike Ralph he was sentenced to perpetual imprisonment. He was briefly released along with other political prisoners, but was promptly beheaded after William's death in 1087. On 31 May 1076 Waltheof was beheaded, on St Giles's Hill near Winchester. He was the only Englishman to have been dealt such a punishment during King William's reign. It is said he had been a man of immense bodily strength, but weak-willed and unreliable yet devout and charitable, and so was regarded by the English as a martyr. Miracles were said to have been worked at his tomb at Crowland in Lincolnshire.

== Sources ==
- Douglas, David C. (1964). William the Conqueror: The Norman Impact Upon England. Berkeley, CA: University of California Press. OCLC 399137.
- Morris, Marc (2012). The Norman Conquest: The Battle of Hastings and the Fall of Anglo-Saxon England. New York: Random House. ISBN 978-1-4481-3602-5.
