= Exning =

Village in Suffolk, England

Coordinates: 52.2667°N 0.35°E

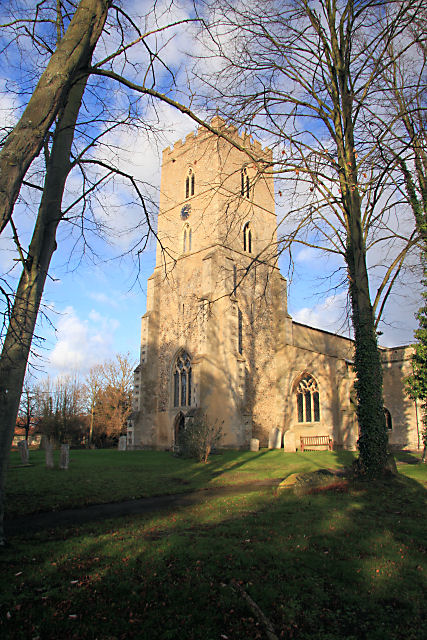
- Church of St Martin, Exning

- Location within Suffolk
- Population: 1,960 (2011)
- District: West Suffolk
- Shire county: Suffolk
- Region: East
- Country: England
- Sovereign state: United Kingdom
- Post town: Newmarket
- Postcode district: CB8
- Dialling code: 01638

Exning is a village and civil parish in the West Suffolk district of Suffolk in eastern England.

It lies just off the A14 trunk road, roughly 12 miles (19 km) east-northeast of Cambridge, and 10 miles (16 km) south-southeast of Ely. The nearest large town is Newmarket.

The most conspicuous building in Exning is the Church of St Martin, which is visible from the A14.

== History ==
Local lore reputes Exning to have been the capital of the Iceni tribe and therefore the home of Queen Boadicea (Boudica).

"The Island", a moated earthworks to the south of the parish is no longer visible following the building of the Newmarket bypass (originally part of the A45, before being redesignated the A14 in 1973. This led to the destruction of the site and its consequential delisting as a scheduled monument. However the site was examined before its destruction.

Exning is reputed to have been the birthplace of Saint Ethelreda, to whom Ely Cathedral is dedicated, though this is disputed.

A spring at Exning was named St Wendreda's Well, and a local legend had it that the seventh-century Saint Wendreda used its water for healing. Newmarket jockeys used to take horses there to drink before a race.

The 1075 marriage at Exning, unsanctioned by King William I, between the Earl of East Anglia, Ralph de Gael, and Emma de Breteuil, the daughter of the powerful William FitzOsbern may have started the Revolt of the Earls.

At the time of William the Conqueror, Exning was in Staploe Hundred. Later, the settlement was in the Liberty of Ely. When the powers of the Liberty were reduced, some of its territory returned to Suffolk, including Exning – albeit as a part of Lackford Hundred, where it would remain until the Victorian period. For several centuries, the part of Suffolk centred on Exning was almost an enclave of the county within the confines of Cambridgeshire. The parish of Newmarket All Saints was transferred from Cambridgeshire to this virtual enclave in 1894, but it continued to be practically detached until boundary changes in the area widened considerably the "bridge" between it and the rest of Suffolk a hundred years later.

The Rosery Hotel is an early Victorian building which was frequently visited by Queen Mary.

During the Second World War, the headquarters of No. 3 Group of RAF Bomber Command were located in Harraton House. Nearby Newmarket Heath, the northwest corner of which borders on Exning, was used as an airfield, RAF Newmarket, for, amongst others, Stirling III Bombers of No. 75 (NZ) Squadron RAF. Little evidence remains of this chapter in Exning's history, apart from a single aircraft hangar on Heath Road, Burwell (near the One Thousand Guineas Connect service station on the A14 trunk road) and a memorial plaque on the racecourse.

=== 1977 F-111 crash ===
On Thursday 15 December 1977, General Dynamics F-111 Aardvark 70-2380 of the 493rd Tactical Fighter Squadron in Suffolk, suffered a hydraulic failure and crashed 300 yards from the Scaltback Middle School. Both air crew ejected, landing a few miles away.

- Captain Jerry L. Kemp, 30, pilot, from Dayton, Ohio
- Captain Thomas E. Bergam, 29, WSO from New London, Connecticut

== See also ==
- Landwade, a neighbouring village that was formerly in Cambridgeshire but is now part of Exning parish
