= Roger de Breteuil, 2nd Earl of Hereford =

English nobleman (c. 1056 – after 1087)

Roger de Breteuil, 2nd Earl of Hereford (c. 1056 – after 1087), succeeded in 1071 to the earldom of Hereford and the English estate of his father, William Fitz-Osbern. He is known to history for his role in the Revolt of the Earls.

== Revolt of the Earls ==
Roger did not keep on good terms with William the Conqueror, and in 1075, disregarding William's prohibition, Roger married his sister Emma to Ralph Guader, Earl of Norfolk.

Immediately afterward, the two earls rebelled. Roger, who was to bring his forces from the west to join forces with those of the Earl of Norfolk, was held in check at the River Severn by the Worcestershire fyrd, which was led by the English Bishop Wulfstan, Walter de Lacy, and other Normans.

Roger had been as close "as a son" to Archbishop Lanfranc of Canterbury, who sent him a number of missives imploring him to cease his actions; these were ignored, and Roger was excommunicated.

=== Trial, sentence, and reprieve ===
On the collapse of their rebellion uprising, Roger was tried for treason before the Great Council, for his role in the Revolt of the Earls. Roger was deprived of his lands and earldom in 1075 and sentenced to perpetual imprisonment. Ralph Guader and Waltheof, 1st Earl of Northumberland were charged as co-conspirators.

Orderic Vitalis reports that Roger remained imprisoned following the death of William I in 1087, despite the release of his other political prisoners.

== Family ==
Though Roger is not known to have married, he left two sons, Reginald and Roger. Living during the reign of Henry I of England, they were described as young men of great promise, but nonetheless were excluded from succeeding to Roger's lands. This has led to disagreement among scholars as to whether or not they were of legitimate birth. Roger's son Reginald fitz Count married Emmeline de Ballon, the daughter and heiress of Hamelin de Ballon, whose inherited land he held in her right. Their descendants, using the de Ballon surname, were lords of Much Marcle.

== See also ==
- French entry for "Roger de Breteuil"
