= Ralph de Gael =

11th-century earl of East Anglia

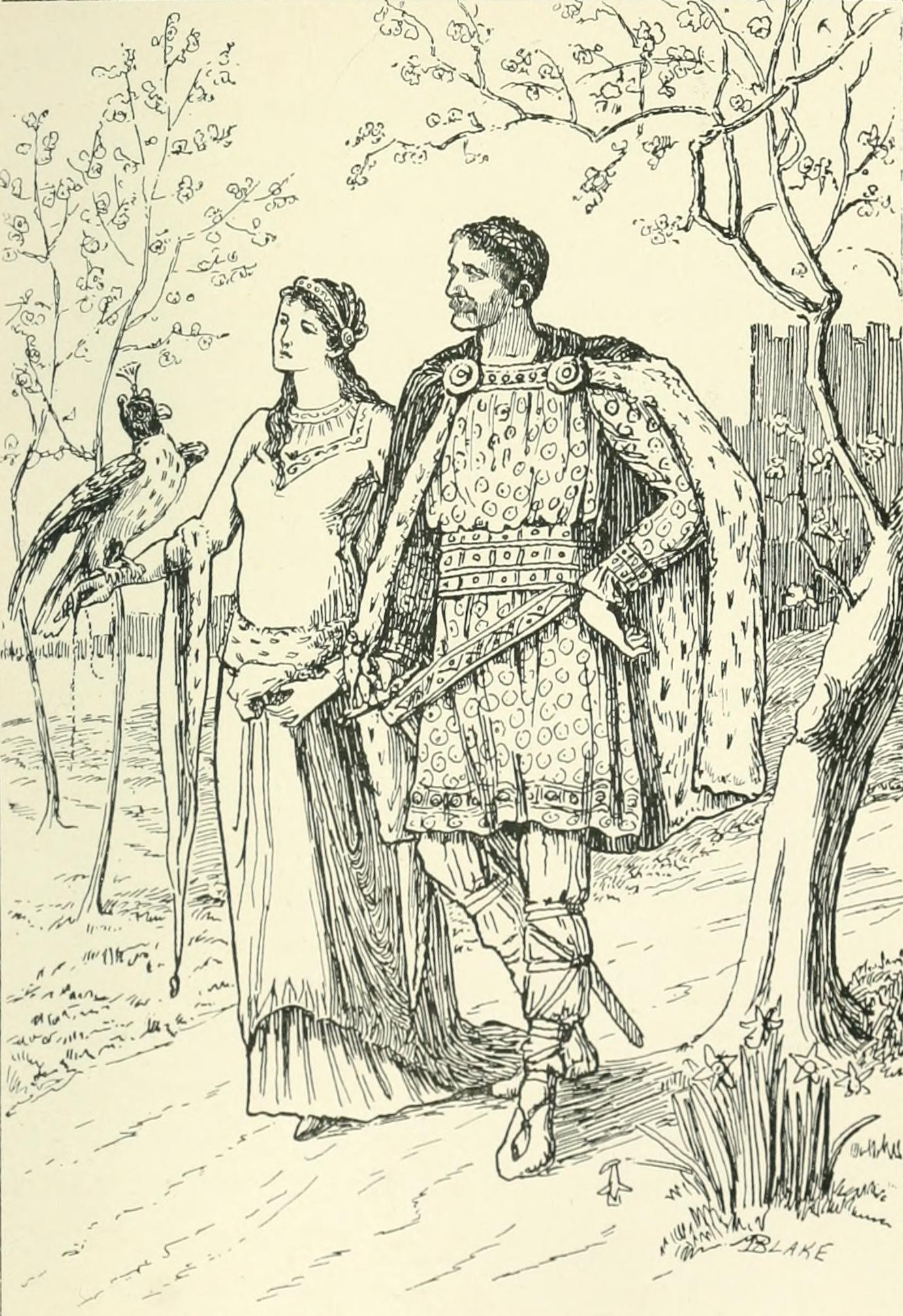
- The Siege of Norwich Castle

Earl of East Anglia, Lord of Gaël and Montfort (Seigneur de Gaël et Montfort)

Personal details
- Born: c. 1042
- Died: 1100
- Spouse(s): Emma FitzOsborn, Countess of Norfolk
- Children: William (Guillame) de Gael; Alain de Gael; Raoul II de Gael

Ralph de Gaël (otherwise Ralph de Guader, Ralph Wader or Radulf Waders or Ralf Waiet or Rodulfo de Waiet; before 1042 – 1100) was the Earl of East Anglia (Norfolk and Suffolk) and Lord of Gaël and Montfort (Seigneur de Gaël et Montfort). He was the leading figure in the Revolt of the Earls, the last serious revolt against William the Conqueror.

== Birth ==
Ralph de Gaël was born as a noble before 1042, most probably about 1040. He was the high-born son of an Earl Ralph who was English, or born in England, and lived at the time of the Confessor. Some sources believe this to be Ralph the Staller, while others argue that he was the son of Earl Ralph Mantes of Hereford, and who briefly held the Earldom of East Anglia. Both English and French sources highlight that he had mixed ancestry, both English, and with a Breton parent, possibly his mother, that was 'Bryttisc' meaning 'British', a Breton. Other sources state that it was his father who was of Breton ancestry (although born in Norfolk), and that his mother was English. French sources state that he was a 'man of illustrious birth, descended from the Kings of the Bretons', including warrior saint King Judicaël, the castle of Gaël being the traditional seat of the kings of Brittany.

In the Domesday Book, an English Alsi, is named as 'nephew of Earl Ralph', and a Godwin, English with Anglo-Saxon and possible Dutch connections, is named as Earl Ralph's uncle. Other sources cite a possible relation (possibly a cousin), to rebel Hereward the Wake, also stated to be of noble birth. His wedding feast and associations highlight connections to both Anglo-Saxon and Danish nobles, as well as his vast inherited lands in Brittany.

== Inheritances ==
Flag of Norfolk

He inherited the great Breton barony of Gaël, which comprised more than forty parishes. In England, he also inherited estates, but it is not known whether he obtained the earldom of Norfolk immediately on his father's death. Shortly after the Norman conquest, he held large estates in Norfolk, as well as property in Suffolk, Essex, Hertford, and possibly other counties. He was named Earl of East Anglia by William I. Some accounts suggest that his service in the conquest restored lands that were already his by inheritance. This is mentioned in the Norman chronicler Wace's account of the conquest of 1066:

Next, the company of Neel rode Raol de Gael; he was himself a Breton, and led Bretons; he served for the land he had, but he held it short time enough, for he forfeited it, as they say.

== Prior to the Revolt of 1075 ==
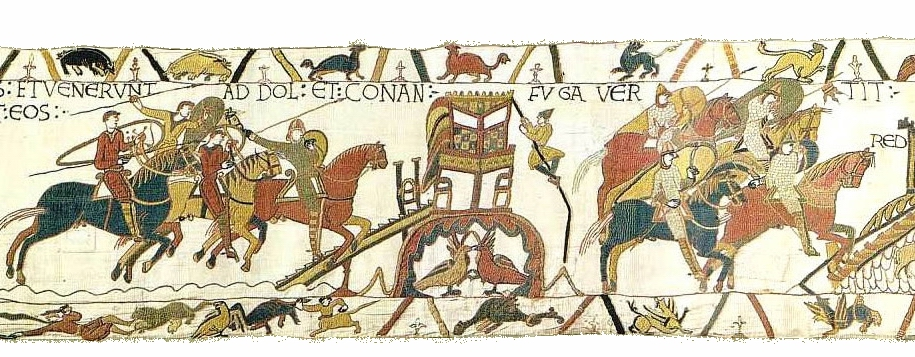
Bayeux Tapestry Scene 18a

In 1065 he was with Conan II, Duke of Brittany when he besieged Rivallon I of Dol, Lord of Dol, in the castle of Combourg.

He fought at the Battle of Hastings in 1066, and was known for his bravery and strength of character. Later he is found in February or March 1068 at William the Conqueror's court.

Then in 1069, he routed a force of Norsemen which had invaded Norfolk and occupied Norwich, and he would later be created Earl of Norfolk and Suffolk, or of the East Angles, the earldom being also styled, from its capital, "of Norwich".

It was likely this Ralph who on 13 April 1069 was with the king at Winchester and he witnessed, as Earl Ralph, a diploma in favour of St Denis of Paris and a grant in favour of the Bishop of Essex. He also attested a charter between 1068 and 1070 as "Comes", a hereditary count.

Ralph built a church, St Peter Mancroft in Norwich, in the new town, and gave it to his chaplains.

== Marriage ==
In 1075, at the manor of Exning, Cambridgeshire, Ralph married Emma, the only daughter of William FitzOsbern, 1st Earl of Hereford and his first wife Alice (or Adelise/Adelissa), herself daughter of Roger I of Tosny. Their marriage united two extremely large estates, as well as noble lines, including the English royal lineage. Some writers have indicated that King William I may have seen the alliance as a threat to his reign.

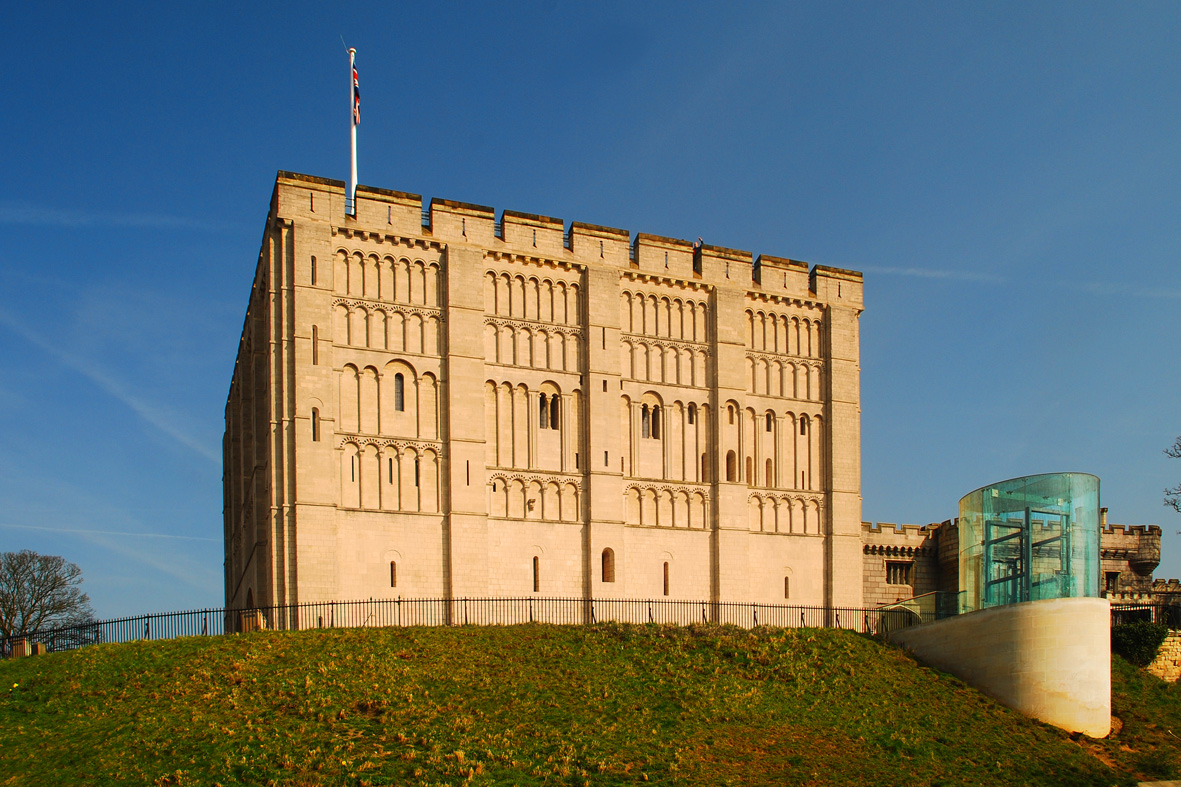
Norwich Castle keep, 2009

== Revolt of the Earls ==
The king's refusal to sanction the marriage between Ralph and Emma, from two powerful families, caused a revolt in his absence. Ralph and Emma married in spite of the King's disapproval. At the Wedding Feast 'Bride Ale', Ralph, his new brother-in-law Roger de Breteuil, 2nd Earl of Hereford, and Anglo-Saxon Earl Waltheof, 1st Earl of Northumberland planned a revolt against the king. Orderic Vitalis stated some of the grievances that led to the revolt. These included William I's tendency to knock off any real or perceived threats to his crown.

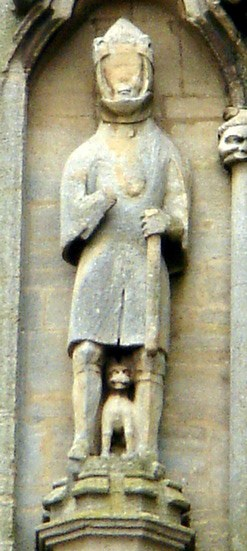
Waltheof, Earl of Northumbria Croyland Abbey

... He who now bears the title of king is unworthy of it, as being a bastard, and it must be evident that it is displeasing to God such a master should govern the kingdom. He is involved in endless quarrels in his dominions over the sea, being at variance not only with strangers but with his own children, and in the midst of his difficulties his own creatures desert him. He has deserved this by the crimes which are openly tallied of all over the world. He disinherited and drove out of Normandy William Werlenc, Count de Mortain, for a single word. Walter, Count de Pontoise, nephew of King Edward, and Biota his wife, being his guests at Falaise, were both his victims by poison in one and the same night. Conan, also, was taken off by poison at William's instigation; that valiant count whose death was mourned through the whole of Brittany with unutterable grief on account of his great virtues. These, and other such crimes have been perpetrated by William in the case of his own kinsfolk and relations, and he is ever ready to act the same part towards us and our peers. He has impudently usurped the glorious crown of England, iniquitously murdering the rightful heirs, or driving them into cruel banishment. He has not even rewarded according to their merits his own adherents, those by whose valour he has been raised to a pitch of eminence exceeding that of all his race. Many of these who sired their blood in his service have been treated with ingratitude, and on slight pretests have been sentenced to death, as if they were his enemies. To his victorious soldiers, covered with wounds, were allotted barren farms and domains depopulated by the ravages of war; and even these his avarice subsequently compelled them to surrender in part or in whole. These things cause him to be generally hated, and his death would be the signal for universal joy.

— Ordericus Vitalis, History of England and Normandy by Thomas Forester

Work began to prepare the revolt; however, the plan was discovered by William after Waltheof lost heart and confessed the conspiracy to Lanfranc, the Archbishop of Canterbury, who urged Earl Roger to return to his allegiance, and finally excommunicated him and his adherents. Waltheof was imprisoned for a year, and later executed by William. Many believed that this action cursed William I for the rest of his life. The last of the Anglo-Saxon earls, Waltheof had been known in his life as kind and pious. A cult later developed around Waltheof, who became a martyr to the oppressed English. His body is believed to have moved after death, he appeared in visions, and healing miracles were reported at his tomb, and many pilgrims began to visit his grave. The Norse poet Þorkell Skallason composed a memorial poem for Waltheof—"Valþjófsflokkr".

Immediately after the confession of Waltheof, the Revolt now had inadequate time to prepare. Ralph retreated from the force led by warrior bishops Odo of Bayeux and Geoffrey de Montbray (the latter ordered that all rebels should have their right foot cut off) near Cambridge and retreated hurriedly to Norwich, hotly pursued by the royal army. Emma stayed to defend Norwich Castle, while Ralph sailed for Denmark in search of help (which may indicate familial ties), and returned to England with a fleet of 200 ships under Knud, son of King Svend, and Jarl Hakon, which arrived too late, and instead sacked the Norman Cathedral St Peter's Minster in York, where a previous Saxon church had been destroyed.

== Holding the fort ==
Meanwhile, Countess Emma bravely held the fort at Norwich Castle until she had negotiated terms for herself and the safe escape of her followers, who were deprived of their lands, but allowed forty days to leave the realm. Countess Emma escaped to Brittany, where she was rejoined by her husband. Ralph was deprived of all his lands and of his earldom. Roger was captured, and despite being much more involved in the revolt than Waltheof, was merely imprisoned, and released on William I's death in 1087.

Ralph and Emma both safely escaped England to Ralph's vast inherited lands in Brittany.

== Baron of Brittany ==
Following Ralph and Emma's escape from England, they settled at their inherited lands in Brittany. As well as Gaël, these lands included 40 parishes, including Gauder Castle and Montfort castle, located at the confluence of the Meu river. Ralph and Emma then lived as great Barons of Brittany.

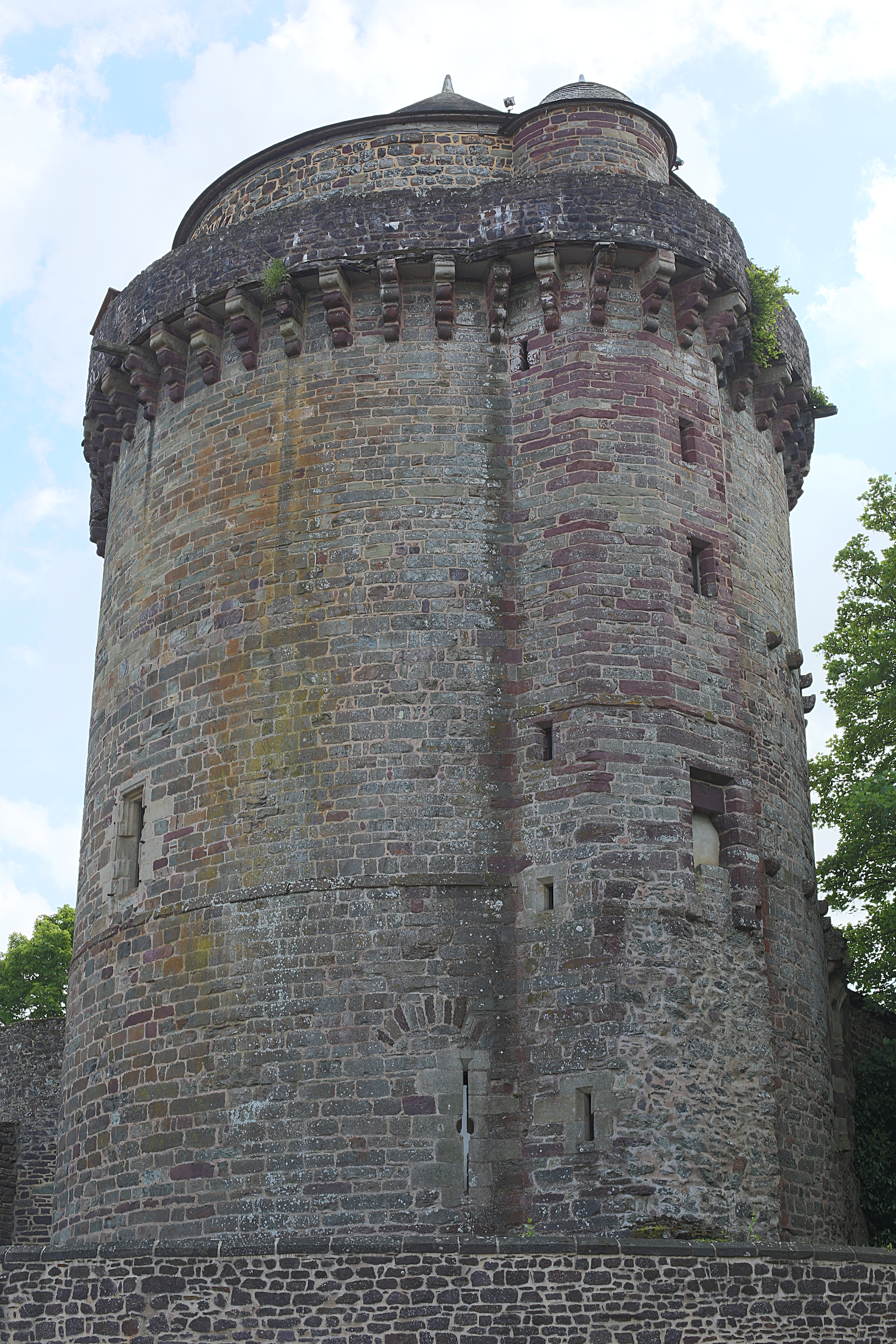
Montfort-sur-Meu – Tour du Papegault

In 1076, William I summoned an army, crossed the sea to France, and attempted to attack Ralph who was stationed at his Castle of Dol. William had enlisted Hoël II, Duke of Brittany in the conflict. William met with a humiliating defeat. His forces were overwhelmed and resoundingly defeated as the King of France, with a large army, roared to the defence of the Bretons; whereupon William departed thence, having lost there both men and horses, and many of his treasures'. This resulted in such great losses for King William, that he conceded defeat, and "with so great loss of men, horses, and money, that the next year he was glad to make peace with him; and thus ended the whole affair, in the year 1077". Peace was made.

In 1089, Ralph attested the judgment in a dispute between the monks of Redon Abbey and the chaplains of the Duke of Brittany. He also attested a charter of Alan IV, Duke of Brittany, in favour of St. George's Abbey (on the site of the current Saint George Palace) at Rennes (1084–1096).

William being dead, Ralph appears in Normandy c. 1093 as a witness in the record of a suit between the abbots of Lonlay-l'Abbaye and Saint-Florent de Besneville.

== Children ==
Arms of the lords of Montfort: Argent a cross Gules gringollée Or

Ralph and Emma's children were:

- William (Guillame) de Gael, succeeded his father as Seigneur de Gael. He claimed Breteuil after the death of his uncle William de Breteuil in 1103, but died shortly thereafter, according to Orderic Vitalis.
- Alain de Gael, who went with his parents on the First Crusade.
- Raoul II de Gael, seigneur of Gaël and Montfort. Like his father, he was an extremely skilled warrior and fighter. He was the youngest, but inherited his father's estates. By 1119, he had obtained the honour of Breteuil in Normandy (his uncle William de Breteuil died 1103 without any legitimate issue). He had several children by his wife, including a daughter named Amice (Amicia). Amice was initially betrothed to Richard, a highly regarded son of Henry I by his mistress Ansfrida, but her betrothed died on the White Ship disaster in November 1120. She was then married, in 1121, to the king's ward, Robert de Beaumont, 2nd Earl of Leicester, second (twin) son of Robert de Beaumont, Count of Meulan.

Raoul II's other descendants continued to hold his estates in Brittany. French sources state that his son, Guillame, inherited the barony of Montfort after the death of Raoul II, who died at his castle in Montfort in 1142. Guillame was of a more peaceful temperament than his father or grandfather. He married Alice de Porhoët, and lived peacefully at his castle. He strengthened the fortifications around Montfort Castle and founded Abbeys nearby, which he later retired to, in old age. The line of inheritance continued, (sometimes with a female heiress as Lord) acquiring Laval and Vitré in the 15th century with the marriage of the heiress of Montmorency-Laval.

== Crusade ==
In September 1096, accompanied by his wife and son Alain, and in the army of Robert Curthose (second son of William I), he went on the First Crusade to the Holy Land. After wintering in Italy, crossed over to Epirus, where they joined Bohemond, and reached Nicaea early in June 1097, where Ralph was one of the Breton leaders who took part in the siege of Nicaea. After this, they joined Bohemund I of Antioch's division of the army. Ralph is again mentioned as fighting at the Battle of Dorylaeum with his son Alan on 1 July 1097. Ralph and Emma died in the holy land, witnessing the capture of Jerusalem in 1099, but dying the following year on the road from Jerusalem.

== Bibliography ==
- Keats-Rohan, K.S.B. (1992). The Bretons and Normans of England 1066-1154: the family, the fief and the feudal monarchy (PDF). Vol. 36. pp. 42–78. Archived from the original (PDF) on 24 July 2011.
