= The Holy Thief =

Book by Ellis Peters

- First edition
- Author: Ellis Peters
- Series: The Cadfael Chronicles
- Genre: Mystery novel
- Publisher: Headline
- English publication date: 1992
- Media type: Print (Hardcover, Paperback) & audio book
- Pages: 282
- ISBN: 0-7472-0686-4
- OCLC: 26856865
- Preceded by: The Summer of the Danes
- Followed by: Brother Cadfael's Penance

The Holy Thief is a medieval mystery novel by Ellis Peters set in 1144–1145. It is the 19th and penultimate volume of the Cadfael Chronicles, first published in 1992.

It was adapted for television in 1998 by Carlton Media for ITV.

Heavy rains flood the river which in turn floods the Abbey, threatening the precious reliquary of Saint Winifred. When the waters recede, the saint is gone, beginning a long search with tangled motives, including a murder that challenges the monks.

This novel was well-received when it was published. Some commented on the finely wrought prose, and the author's ability to bring the reader to another time, making that time vividly alive. Another says the plot is "Less predictable and far more complex" than the prior novels in this series.

== Introduction to plot ==
On 16 September 1144, Geoffrey de Mandeville's reign of terror in the Fens comes to an end when Geoffrey succumbs to an infection, brought on by a minor graze from an arrow. King Stephen had worked for a year to confine the marauding within a ring of forts and castles. In the heat of August, the one-time Earl of Essex went out without his chain mail and helmet at Burwell, northeast of Cambridge, where an archer's arrow reached its target. Besides being stripped of his lands by King Stephen, he and his eldest son were excommunicate for his seizure of Ramsey Abbey, which he used as his headquarters. There was no place for him to be buried, so rejected was he from England and his religion. Empress Maud gave the title back to the younger namesake son, but she could not grant the lands – a fairly empty gesture. The rest of England was relieved as they learned by the passing of small bands of brigands looking for places to lie low, that they could again venture out without fear of seizure or murder by his organised band of brigands and marauders.

As de Mandeville is dying, his allies who hope to mend fences wrote grants returning church property to its owners, including Ramsey Abbey. Before the end of 1144, Abbot Walter gets word he again has an Abbey to lead in the Fens. He sends word to collect his prior and sub-prior, and ask all the monks to return, to rebuild their home after more than a year away. The devastation is so extensive, the brothers not only begin work themselves, but also reach out to their fellows in other Benedictine monasteries in England for aid.

== Plot summary ==
Two visitors from the now reviving Ramsey Abbey arrive in February 1145. Sub-prior Herluin and young Brother Tutilo request alms and aid in restoring their abbey. The Abbey of Saint Peter and Saint Paul and the people of Shrewsbury respond generously. Herluin seeks Sulien Blount at Longner Manor. Sulien will not rejoin as a monk. The family gives coppice wood for rebuilding. Lady Donata, Sulien's ailing mother, has the pleasure of hearing beautiful music from young Brother Tutilo. She donates her personal jewellery for Ramsey Abbey. Also staying at the Abbey is a successful Provençal troubadour, Rémy of Pertuis, his groom and a singer.

The Sheriff cries the warning that the River Severn is rising rapidly. A chaotic scene develops as the flood continues to rise after dark, as items of value are moved without benefit of lamps or candles within the Abbey buildings by monks and guests, and the cart for Ramsey Abbey is loading to leave. Herluin and Tutilo ride out to Worcester.

When the flood subsides, in place of Saint Winifred's reliquary they find a wrapped piece of timber, the same size and heft, showing this to be a planned theft. The Sheriff and Prior Robert are dispatched to meet Herluin for what he knows. James of Betton returns to the Abbey more than a week after the cart set out, with the news that cart did not make it all the way to Ramsey Abbey – the same news Nicol delivers to Herluin in Worcester. Nicol leads them to the place of the ambush.

The reeve finds the reliquary in Ullesthorpe, where the brigands dumped it, and carries it to safety at Huncote, home of the Earl of Leicester. The Sheriff, the Prior and the sub-prior explain the story of the reliquary to the Earl. Herluin and Prior Robert explain this loss and rediscovery as the saint's own actions. Earl Robert sees the competition between them for it, and lightheartedly makes his claim, as it was found safe on his land. Earl Robert joins them in carrying it the long journey home in state.

Cadfael finds Aldhelm, who moved the reliquary at the request of a monk. Brother Jerome eavesdrops on Hugh and Cadfael speaking about this visit, expecting Aldhelm to confirm Tutilo as the one who put the reliquary on the wagon. Bénezet, the groom, overhears Jerome talking with Prior Robert, and shares the word with Daalny, the singer, who tells Tutilo. Jerome is not seen that evening. Aldhelm does not appear at the agreed time. After Lauds, Tutilo returns, deeply shaken, after tripping over a dead man in the dark on his return to the Abbey from another visit to Longner Manor. At dawn, Cadfael and Hugh confirm the dead man is Aldhelm. He was stunned by a hit on the head with a piece of fallen wood; next his head was smashed by a large stone, which was carefully replaced. Hugh Beringar, Radulfus, Prior Robert, Cadfael, Sub-prior Herluin, and Earl Robert gather. Tutilo confesses that he did take the saint, as she encouraged him to help Ramsey Abbey in this way. He had no part in this murder. Tutilo is put in a penitential cell of the Abbey. There remain three claims to possession of the saint in her reliquary. The earl wants an unbiased judge. Radulfus proposes a method.

Sulien Blount arrives after Compline, requesting Tutilo for his mother who will not last the night. Radulfus agrees, sending Tutilo under guard. He sings for her as she quietly dies. He returns before dawn on a day in early March, with the gift of a psaltery and words of advice on the needs of a troubadour.

The four conduct the sortes Biblicae, placing the book of the gospels on Saint Winifred's reliquary in front of the monks. Each verse is accepted as the saint telling them where the reliquary of Saint Winifred belongs.

Radulfus

The last shall be first, and the first last. Matthew Ch 20 verse 16

Earl Robert

Ye shall seek me, and shall not find me; and where I am, thither ye cannot come. John Ch 7 verse 54

Father Herluin

I tell you, I know you not, whence you came. Depart from me, ye workers of iniquity… Luke Ch 13 verse 27

Prior Robert

Ye have not chosen me, but I have chosen you. John Ch 15 verse 16

The breeze in the chapel turns the pages

And the brother shall deliver up the brother to death. Matthew Ch 10 verse 21

They agree that the saint stays on her altar at Shrewsbury Abbey. Cadfael dares not explain his verse to Earl Robert. The sober last verse causes them to turn to the monks for their aid. Jerome unexpectedly confesses to the murder. He describes his actions up to striking Aldhelm on the head with a piece of wood in the dark, then leaving upon discovering it was not Tutilo as he anticipated. Jerome wails out his pain in the second penitentiary cell.

Daalny lets Tutilo out of his cell. Herluin is enraged; the Earl is not bothered. Daalny says that someone here is a thief. Bénezet realises she means him; he flees on someone else's horse. They find two surprises in his saddle bags. One is the bag of silver coins and Lady Donata's gold jewellery meant for Ramsey Abbey. It never left Shrewsbury Abbey. The other is a laundered shirt, with blood stains on it. Bénezet killed Aldhelm, waited for him, fearing that Aldhelm might have seen him take the alms out of the coffer the night of the flood. Hugh's men hold Bénezet for murder. The Earl asks for Daalny to be fetched from Saint Winifred's chapel. She is gone. The Earl seems to expect this. Rémy mourns her loss, but is very pleased to be part of the Earl's household.

Hugh and Cadfael are relieved that the seals of the reliquary were never opened. Cadfael is pleased that Tutilo and Daalny have joined for a new free life for both, and impressed that Donata, finally free from her years of pain, was the one who read the lad aright.

== Characters ==
- Brother Cadfael: Herbalist monk at Abbey of Saint Peter and Saint Paul; 64 or 65 years old in this story. He is much attached to Saint Winifred and a shrewd observer of people and events.
- Abbot Radulfus: Head of the Shrewsbury Abbey, strong and quick thinking man, based on the real abbot of that year.
- Prior Robert Pennant: Of Norman heritage and aristocratic family; led the effort seven years before to bring Saint Winifred's bones in the fine silver chased reliquary to her altar at the Abbey chapel, and wrote a book of her life. Based on the real prior of the time.
- Brother Anselm: Precentor and librarian of Shrewsbury Abbey, about 10 years younger than Cadfael.
- Brother Rhun: Young monk healed by a true miracle of Saint Winifred, causing him to join the monastery and tend her altar. Recalled every detail of the wrapping and moving of her reliquary before the theft during the flood of the River Severn. 19 or 20 years old in this story. Introduced in The Pilgrim of Hate.
- Brother Winfrid: Young monk in assistance to Cadfael in the gardens; noticed Brother Jerome eavesdropping while Hugh and Cadfael spoke in privacy. Introduced in The Hermit of Eyton Forest.
- Brother Jerome: Clerk to Prior Robert, reliable source of news for the Prior, and very upset that their reliquary was stolen. He shows a new facet of himself in this novel, reaching new lows.
- Father Boniface: Pastor of the church of Holy Cross in the Foregate, where Herluin appealed to the locals for alms for Ramsey Abbey. Introduced in The Heretic's Apprentice.
- Cynric: Verger to Father Boniface and helper in the moving of goods to safety, loading the gifts to the Ramsey Abbey. Introduced in The Raven in the Foregate.
- Sub-Prior Herluin: A monk and priest who is leading a group from the now-restoring Benedictine Abbey at Ramsey, freed from the attacks of the marauding band of the late Geoffrey de Mandeville, once Earl of Essex. He is a strong leader, an ambitious man, harsh with his subordinates, and easy to anger compared to Radulfus or Cadfael. Arrived with three lay servants and one novice. About 50 years old.
- Brother Tutilo: Young novice in the party with Herluin. As a novice, he was named after an Irish-born monk, Saint Tutilo, who lived over 200 years earlier at the monastery of Saint Gall, for his excellent singing voice and skills with musical instruments. Third son of a poor man, he feels the monastery his only pathway in life; he is determined to do well, and a bit of a dreamer in his high hopes. He knows that one can have the voice of an angel without being one. About 20 years old.
- Dowager Lady Donata Blount: Of Longner Manor, about 46 years old, widow, "withered in her prime" by a chronic, wasting, and painful disease; gave generously of her own gold jewellery to the restoration of the Ramsey Abbey; lover of music. She is very pleased by Tutilo's music and singing. She reads his young character well, calling him a troubadour. She is a strong woman though physically frail. Introduced in The Potter's Field.
- Sulien Blount: Younger son of Lady Donata, settled home after a mistaken year in novitiate at Ramsey Abbey. He is training to take arms under the Sheriff after his mother dies; now working at the family manor headed by his older brother Eudo until he can make his own way, and marry. Introduced in The Potter's Field.
- Eudo Blount: Lord of Longner Manor, elder brother of Sulien and eldest son of Lady Donata. He sent seasoned logs by cart to Shrewsbury Abbey to aid in reconstruction of Ramsey Abbey. Big, strong, fair man, married with a child. About 25 years old. Introduced in The Potter's Field.
- Gregory: Carter from Longner Manor who loaded the logs from their own cart to an Abbey cart for the gift to Ramsey Abbey, on the day the river water rose in the Shrewsbury Abbey buildings.
- Lambert: Younger carter from Longner Manor who assisted Gregory in the tasks at the Manor and at Shrewsbury Abbey on the day the water rose up in the Abbey.
- Aldhelm: Worker from Preston who aided Gregory and Lambert with the timber, and aided the monks as directed, as they moved items of value up away from the encroaching water in the Abbey buildings. He normally tended the sheep at Upton. Murdered en route to the Abbey to point out which monk asked him to help move the reliquary.
- Rémy of Pertuis: Troubadour from Provence (composer and singer of songs and poems) resting three days (at start of story) at the Abbey guest house due to an injured horse. Seeking work in Chester, but open to better opportunities. Man of 50 or so.
- Bénezet: A groom and body servant to Rémy of Pertuis, tall, in his thirties, also of Provence.
- Daalny: Bondwoman, born a slave in a manor near Gloucester to an Irish woman; sold to Rémy, who treats her well. She speaks English and some Welsh. Rémy includes her beautiful singing and playing of instruments in his performances for the nobility. Young at 20 but has no illusions due to her previous owners. She was named for a queen in early Irish myth. Likes Tutilo.
- Hugh Beringar: Sheriff of Shropshire appointed by King Stephen, close friend to Cadfael, about 29 years old. He is aware of the secret of the contents of Saint Winifred's reliquary, a secret known only to the two of them in Shropshire, but to all of those in the saint's long time home of Gwytherin in Wales. He shares the same strong sense of justice with Cadfael. He is married to Aline, has a son Giles. Introduced in One Corpse Too Many.
- Robert of Leicester: Earl of lands near Ullesthorpe where the reliquary was found. He is a bright, well-educated, cultured, and quick-witted leader who maintains peace on his own lands. His twin brother Waleran minds their lands in France and Normandy, while Robert does the same for their lands in England. Loyalties, strong with King Stephen, are strained as Geoffrey d'Anjou increases his holdings in Normandy in his son's name. Nicknamed Robert le bossu or Robert Bossu for a feature of his appearance (Robert the hunchback). Real historical person.
- James of Betton: Master carpenter who offers his services to Ramsey Abbey; must walk back to Shrewsbury after they are overtaken by brigands wanting the cart and horses and after he speaks with the reeve of Ullesthorpe. He brings the news to the Abbey of the loss of the gifts to Ramsey Abbey.
- Nicol: Most trusted servant of Sub-prior Herluin, of the party of five men on the cart full of alms and coppice wood that is seized by brigands. He carries the news to Herluin at Worcester, then leads party including Beringar, Prior Robert and sub-prior Herluin to the site of the calamity at Ullesthorpe. About 50 years old.

== Reviews ==
Kirkus Reviews praised the novel's prose for evoking its period.

Publishers Weekly gave the novel a positive review, praising its complexity.

School Library Journal, reviewing it for young adults and teens, described it as unusual and entertaining.

== Setting in history ==
This novel is set in several locations in England. The story is set in Shrewsbury, located in Shropshire, England; briefly in Worcester Cathedral; and at Huncote, a manor of Robert, Earl of Leicester, not far from Ullesthorpe. Some scenes were at Longner Manor, east and south from the Abbey, crossing the Severn at a ferry location, near modern Uffington and shown clearly on the map titled Shrewsbury and Environs in the printed book. These were real places in the twelfth century, and now. The troubador Rémy was from a city in the south of France populated then and now, Pertuis, an area where troubadours may have started.

It occurs during the Anarchy, which began when King Stephen's claim to the throne was disputed by his cousin Empress Maud in 1138. With the help of her ally and half-brother Robert of Gloucester, the two sides fought since that year. After all this time, no resolution was in sight and England suffered much while the attention of the king was focussed on fighting to keep his crown. The story begins with the death of Geoffrey de Mandeville.

=== The Anarchy and Geoffrey de Mandeville ===
The start of Geoffrey de Mandeville's story was told, in this series of novels, in The Potter's Field, the 17th Chronicle of Brother Cadfael. After King Stephen accused him of treason, revoked his title as Earl of Essex and took away his lands, Geoffrey de Mandeville responded by taking over the Ramsey Abbey in the Fens in East Anglia. This became the headquarters for his rampaging band of marauders for over a year. King Stephen built a ring of castles as his bases to contain the marauding, but could never draw him into a direct battle. Instead, de Mandeville's life was ended by a chance arrow shot from one of those castles at Burwell, on a hot August day when the one-time earl mistakenly removed his helmet and upper chain mail. The wound from the arrow led to an infection, fatal to him a month later on 16 September 1144. He had been excommunicated for his taking of Ramsey Abbey, such that only the Pope in person could revoke it. He died unshriven, with no legal place to bury him in England. Some of the Knights Templar did put his remains to rest at a site where the Temple Church in London was later built (in 1185) and somewhat ironically near the center of law and lawyers in London.

His accomplices in burning homes, burning or stealing crops, killing local residents, and pillaging the stolen property of the church, could not keep their hold on the Fens without his leadership. Those who joined up as pure bandits themselves scattered, hoping to find safe harbour and new victims elsewhere. One such band may have been the thieves of the horses and cart in the novel. The allies of Geoffrey de Mandeville who sought some reconciliation after his death moved quickly to record writs returning the stolen properties back to the church. Word of this change travelled slowly to the people of the area, and to Abbot Walter of Ramsey Abbey. By the end of 1144, he called back his prior, sub-prior and the monks, to begin a huge task of rebuilding their home, then reviving their estates for agriculture. Two months after Abbot Walter returned to his Abbey, he dispatched monks to request help from neighbouring Abbeys, as far as Shrewsbury, where the main plot of The Holy Thief begins.

=== Earl Robert of Leicester ===
Earl Robert was a real person in history, quite involved in King Stephen's fortunes. Robert and his brother Waleran, twin sons of Robert, Count of Meulan who held lands and title in England and in France, supported Stephen in battle early on, but at this story, are in a difficult position. Waleran, whose title came from the lands he inherited in France and Normandy, had to come to terms with Geoffrey of Anjou, husband of Empress Maud and father of her son Henry, later King Henry II of England. Geoffrey of Anjou had consolidated his holdings in Anjou and Normandy, becoming a major force there that Waleran was forced to recognise, as Stephen had lost his position in Normandy. Waleran did not overtly support the Empress on English soil, but was constrained from overt support of King Stephen. Robert, in England, was similarly constrained, though he had his own title and lands primarily in England. Robert, living in England, did not have his loyalty questioned, but his twin brother, living in Normandy, did, though there was no difference in their true attachments. Robert used this time to keep the peace on his own lands as much as he could, and gain lands from his neighbour, Earl Ranulf of Chester. When Robert of Gloucester died in 1149, Robert of Leicester joined the movement for the earls in England to make private peace treaties, as suggested in his conversation with Sheriff Hugh Beringar in the novel.

Earl Robert is described as a man of education and culture. In the reign of King Henry II, Robert became the first chief justiciar of England who was also the King's chief minister. He held this position for fourteen years, earning him much respect for his administration of the law. This reputation seemed to be the basis for many conversations between the Earl and the clerics in this novel.

=== The Abbeys ===
Characters in this novel travelled extensively, mainly from Abbey to Abbey. First, Herluin and his party walk from Ramsey Abbey. Abbot Radfulfus of Shrewsbury Abbey gives them horses for their journey to the abbeys at Evesham, Pershore and Worcester. The Sheriff and Prior Robert ride out to Worcester to meet Herluin's party. The five men who took the cart load of alms meant for Ramsey Abbey reached Ullesthorpe. Two walked back to Shrewsbury; two walked on to Ramsey Abbey; and one walked to Worcester. The party at Worcester then proceeded on horseback to Ullesthorpe, whence they are directed to Huncote. One lay servant is left to walk on his own from Worcester to Shrewsbury, which he did, in time to join Herluin for the return to Ramsey Abbey. Earl Robert joins them, with a proper carriage for the reliquary, in the journey back to Shrewsbury. The Earl rides back to Huncote with his party, escorting Herluin and his lay servants that far. Herluin will make the rest of the way to Ramsey Abbey without that welcome escort.

Using modern roads, the distance from Ramsey Abbey to Shrewsbury is 135 miles; a route through Ullesthorpe adds 10 miles to that distance. In The Potter's Field, it took Sulien Blount a week to complete this walk. From Shrewsbury to Ullesthorpe is about 80 miles, and from Shrewsbury to Worcester is 50 miles. From Ullesthorpe to Worcester is nearly 65 miles, walked by Nicol. Worcester to Huncote is about 70 miles. The journey back to Shrewsbury is nearly 90 miles, following a more northerly route. Thus does time pass from February into March for the events of the novel to transpire.

=== Troubadours and Sortes Biblicae ===
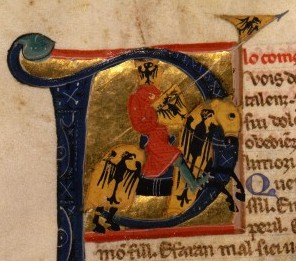
William IX of Aquitaine portrayed as a knight on a chansonnier, troubadour who first composed poetry on returning from the Crusade of 1101

The Middle Ages saw the start of troubadours across Europe. These were learned men who composed poems and songs, and performed them on the musical instruments of the day for the nobility. Troubadours travelled with their talents, like Rémy of Pertuis in this novel, and as Lady Donata suggested that Tutilo should do. They would reside in the household of one nobleman for a period of time.

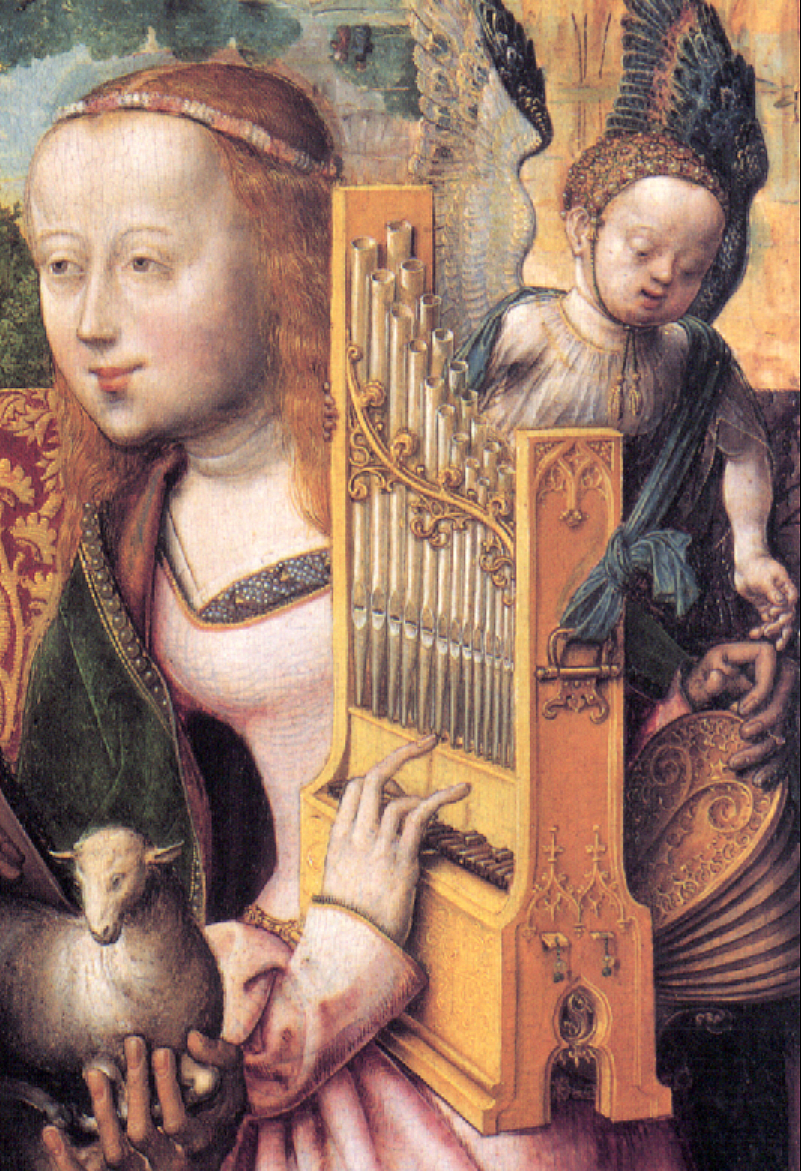
Depiction of a woman playing a portative organ (detail from a painting in the Alte Pinakothek in Munich). The bellows can be seen to the right of the pipes.

The word troubadour has its origins in an old language of Provence and Languedoc, in the area where the langue d'Oc language was long ago used (Occitania or lo Pais d'Oc, the Oc Country). Songs of chivalry and romantic love were common, along with satire and some vulgar humour. The troubadours made use of their clerical education in the writing of songs. Some go so far in our modern era to claim the works of the troubadours were the origins of literature.

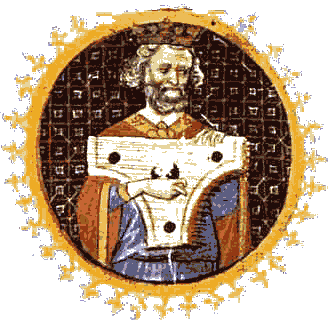
Psaltery of the 14th century from the book: De Arythmetica, De Musica by M. Servinius Boetius. The instrument is typically held before the chest with the hands under the curves.

The harp and the psaltery were two of the musical instruments of the day. The mandora, rebec, portative organ, lute or oud, flutes and panflutes were also used, and mentioned in the novel. Lady Donata's gift of a psaltery pleased and amazed Tutilo, and prepared him for the first steps of becoming a troubadour himself, per her advice.

The sortes Biblicae described in the novel was a method of fortune-telling used for many ages, and in civilisations before medieval England. The users choose important writers, in this story, the authors of the four Gospels, as the source of phrases or sentences that might hint at the future, or the resolution of a problem. One selects a verse at random, then applies it to the present situation, as Abbot Radulfus suggests for resolving the true home for the reliquary. The book chosen was not a complete bible, as those were rarely copied before the printing press. Instead, important sections were copied.

It is sometimes called Sortes Sanctorum or bibliomancy. The verses selected by the author move the story right along. The first one, selected by Radulfus, says that the next person of the four of them to choose a verse should be Earl Robert, the last to enter the story of the reliquary. His selection reveals the paradox of this reliquary; the Earl suspects a paradox but does not learn what it is from Brother Cadfael, the only one in the chapel who knows. The next, chosen by Herluin, tells him he has no business with the reliquary. Prior Robert's selection confirms it belongs in Shrewsbury. The last selection, selected by the breeze in the chapel, is marked by blackthorn blossoms that fell from Brother Cadfael's clothing as he looked at the Bible before the Mass. Prior Robert is pleased by the blossoms, recalling the hawthorn blossoms around the clothing of Brother Columbanus in Wales, just before the monks of Shrewsbury took their saint home seven years earlier. It is a troubling quote in a house of brothers with an unsolved murder, leading to the confession of part of what happened to the murdered man.

It was an intriguing way to resolve a dispute, relying heavily on the deep faith of all the parties in the written words of their religion.

== Publication history ==
At the time this novel was released, the author toured in the United States where she commented "I've been lucky. It's always luck to be able to make a living doing what you love." The series had sold over 6.5 million copies at that time.

Five hardback editions are listed at Fantastic Fiction. The first was issued in August 1992; the most recent was issued in November 1994 in large print by Chivers North America ISBN 0792717449 / 9780792717447 (USA edition). Seven paperback editions have been published. The first was in April 1993 by Headline Book Publishing ISBN 074724040X / 9780751511192 (UK edition). The most recent was in August 1998 by Sphere ISBN 0751527327 / 9780751527322 (UK edition).

Five audio cassette editions were issued, beginning in May 1993 by HarperCollins Audio with Paul Scofield reading, ISBN 0886463572 / 9780886463571 Canada (English speaking) edition, and a simultaneous release in the UK. The last one listed was issued in September 1999 by Chivers Word for Word Audio Books.

This novel was issued for the Kindle in June 2013, ISBN B00E6YTP1G, published by Velmon Books Pty Ltd.

The novel has been translated and published in French, Italian, Spanish, German, Dutch, Polish.

- French: Le voleur de Dieu, Published 1994 by Éditions 10/18, 350 pages ISBN 9782264019493
- Italian: Un sacrilegio per Fratello Cadfael [A Sacrilege to Brother Cadfael] (Hardcover), Published 11 April 2003 by Longanesi La Gaja scienza No. 693, 224 pages, Elsa Pelitti (Translator) ISBN 9788830419612
- Spanish:
  - El santo ladrón, Published by Grijalbo, 1994, ©1992 Barcelona, 305 pages, map ISBN 9788425325892
  - El Santo ladrón, Publisher Debolsillo, Barcelona 2003, 285 pages, María Antonia Menini (Translator) ISBN 9788497596183
- German: Der fromme Dieb, Published 1 May 1998 by Heyne, ISBN 9783453136502)
- Dutch: De heilige dief (Broeder Cadfael, #19), Published 1993 by De Boekerij bv, Paperback, 234 pages, Pieter Janssens (Translator) ISBN 9789022522110
- Polish: Świątobliwy złodziej (Paperback), Published 25 October 2011 by Zysk i S-ka, 328 pages ISBN 9788375067354

In addition to the Spanish language edition in the above list, WorldCat has a Korean edition in its holdings.

- Korean: 성스러운 도둑 /Sŏngsŭrŏun toduk, Author 엘리스 피터스 장편소설; 김훈 옮긴. 김훈.; Ellis Peters; Hun Kim (Translator), 367 pages, map, Publisher 북하우스, Sŏul-si Bukhausŭ, 2002 ISBN 9788956050287

== Television adaptation ==
The Holy Thief was adapted into a television program as part of the Brother Cadfael series by Carlton Media, Central and WGBH Boston for ITV. It filmed on location in Hungary and starred Sir Derek Jacobi as Cadfael.

The resulting episode was the first episode of the fourth series.
