= Brother Cadfael's Penance =

1994 novel by Ellis Peters

- First edition
- Author: Ellis Peters
- Series: The Cadfael Chronicles
- Genre: Mystery novel
- Publisher: Headline
- Publication date: May 1994
- Media type: Print (Hardcover, Paperback) & audio book
- Pages: 288 plus royal family tree, two maps
- ISBN: 0-7472-1184-1
- OCLC: 30702176
- Preceded by: The Holy Thief

Brother Cadfael's Penance is a medieval mystery novel set in the autumn of 1145 by Ellis Peters. It is the last novel in the Cadfael Chronicles, first published in 1994.

When a rebellion arises in the south, Cadfael leaves the Shrewsbury Abbey cloister to save two who are dear to him. One is the son he has not yet acknowledged, held prisoner by a disillusioned knight.

The novel received strongly positive reviews when it was published, and some noted the increasing sales of books in the series. It was "moving and suspenseful", "one of Cadfael's most moving adventures".

== Introduction to plot ==
After eight years, The Anarchy moves into stalemate, as fighting continues in the Thames valley. In the Holy Land, Edessa has fallen, giving rise to a strong desire among bishops in England to end the civil war and redirect fighting men towards another Crusade to keep Jerusalem safe. In the late summer of 1145, the younger son of Robert of Gloucester, Philip FitzRobert, switches sides, yielding his castle at Cricklade to King Stephen. Philip's castellan at Faringdon, Brien de Soulis, quickly follows his example, surrendering his castle to Stephen's besieging forces. Not all the garrison of Faringdon agree to change sides, and thirty men are taken hostage. Robert, Earl of Leicester is given a list of the thirty men and their captors, but one man among Faringdon's garrison is unaccounted for: Olivier de Bretagne.

== Plot summary ==
In November 1145, Robert sends a copy of the list to Hugh Beringar, Sheriff of Shrewsbury, along with news that the two factions will meet for a peace conference at Coventry. Earl Robert asks Hugh to attend. Not seeing Olivier's name among the men being offered for ransom, Hugh tells Cadfael, who tells Abbot Radulfus that he feels it is his duty to rescue his son Olivier, at the risk of breaking his vows. Radulfus allows him to accompany Hugh to Coventry. Beyond that, Cadfael is on his own.

In Lichfield's chapel, Cadfael recognises Yves Hugonin, Olivier's brother-in-law. Riding to Coventry, barely have they entered the town when Yves draws his sword and flies in rage at Brien de Soulis, the turncoat castellan of Faringdon. Order is restored by Bishop Roger de Clinton. Yves is called to a private audience with the Empress Maud. She officially rebukes him for disturbing the peace, yet hints that she would be delighted if de Soulis were killed. The peace talks come to nothing. Before the talks end, Yves asks about Olivier's whereabouts. De Soulis claims to know nothing. In the winter darkness, as the two sides exit the chapel after Compline, Yves trips over the dead body of de Soulis on the chapel steps. Philip FitzRobert accuses Yves of murder. Defying a promise of safe conduct to all who came with the Empress, twelve men seize Yves near Gloucester, which is duly reported to the Bishop.

The Bishop, Cadfael and Hugh examine de Soulis's body and belongings, discovering that de Soulis was stabbed from the front with a dagger. His killer was someone he knew and trusted, and allowed to approach him. In de Soulis's bag, Cadfael finds a seal ring that does not belong to him, which no one in Coventry can identify. Cadfael must decide whether to continue searching for Olivier and Yves and break his monastic vows, or return with Hugh to Shrewsbury. He chooses his son.

At Deerhurst Abbey, Cadfael meets a mason's assistant who identifies the seal as belonging to a captain of the garrison, Geoffrey FitzClare, loyal to the Empress. De Soulis showed the men a document with this seal along with that of the other five captains, agreeing to surrender to the King. This was a ruse, as de Soulis murdered FitzClare, reporting it as an accidental death. Knowing this, Cadfael finds Philip FitzRobert at his castle of La Musarderie in Greenhamsted. He convinces him that Yves is innocent: de Soulis allowed his killer to approach close enough to stab him with a knife, but de Soulis and Yves were open enemies. Repulsed by de Soulis's treachery, Philip releases Yves.

Philip holds Olivier in the castle. Cadfael pleads for his release, offering himself in exchange and revealing that he is Olivier's father. Philip refuses. He and Olivier were the closest of comrades, but Olivier refused to follow his friend in defecting to Stephen. Philip changed sides in the hope of breaking the stalemate between the two sides, which Olivier saw as simple treason. Philip visits Olivier in his cell, telling him of Cadfael's offer. Olivier is dumbfounded, not understanding why Cadfael would do this for him. Philip shares that Cadfael is Olivier's father. Olivier is stunned, then enraged, feeling that Cadfael has cheated him.

In Gloucester, Yves begs the Empress to lay siege to La Musarderie to rescue Olivier. She agrees only after Yves tells her that Philip is there, her nephew but now her enemy. She alarms her advisers when she announces her intention to hang Philip. This brutality would drive a wedge between her and her brother Robert, absent from Gloucester for this discussion, and increase the fighting in this war-torn country. The Empress orders her entire army to Philip's castle. The night before the attack, Yves enters the castle to warn Philip of her intention via Cadfael, and succeeds in this undercover quest. Philip's garrison puts up a tough defence. Philip suffers serious wounds from a crate of metal pieces thrown by a siege engine into the courtyard. Cadfael ministers to him, while Philip gives his final orders before falling unconscious. His deputy shall surrender the castle and trade Philip to the Empress for the best terms he can get; he gives Cadfael the keys to Olivier's cell. As Cadfael releases Olivier, they face each other as father and son. They arrange a plan to get Philip out of the castle to save him from the Empress. Olivier bears no grudge for his imprisonment, living in the moment as his father does. He uses his uniform to get through the besieging forces, seeking a local man who can claim the unconscious Philip as the corpse of his nephew. The plan works, and Philip recovers in the Augustinian Cirencester Abbey. Brought by Olivier, Robert of Gloucester arrives at the abbey to reconcile with his son.

Before leaving La Musarderie, Cadfael learns the killer of de Soulis. Lady Jovetta, lady-in-waiting to the Empress, was Geoffrey FitzClare's mother; she wears as a ring the same design as Geoffrey's seal. Brien de Soulis made what he thought to be an assignation with her niece. He allowed Jovetta to approach him in the mistaken belief that she was the niece. Cadfael keeps her secret.

Olivier and Cadfael ride to Gloucester, where they part. Cadfael asks for word when his grandson is born. Cadfael rides alone through rough winter weather to Shrewsbury, feeling fully the importance of his life in the monastery. Arriving at Shrewsbury Abbey after Matins and Lauds, Cadfael lies prostrate on the floor of the chapel as a penitent. Entering before the rest of the monks, Abbot Radulfus informs him that news came before him. The rift between Philip and his father Robert of Gloucester is mended. Philip in his sick bed has taken the Cross. He will join the next Crusade, having despaired of princes in England. Radulfus declares "it is enough!" and invites Cadfael to take his place among his brothers at Prime.

== Characters ==
- Brother Cadfael: Herbalist monk of the Abbey of Saint Peter and Saint Paul at Shrewsbury, come to the monk's life as an adult. Now 65, he walks away from it in hopes of finding his son, begotten in his days as soldier and sailor in the East. He met his son twice, full-grown, but never told him he had found his father.
- Hugh Beringar: Sheriff of Shropshire, close friend of Cadfael. He seeks for Olivier while at Coventry, though on the other side in this competition for the crown of England. Now 30 years old. Introduced in One Corpse Too Many.
- Abbot Radulfus: Head of the Shrewsbury Abbey. Allows Cadfael to leave the cloister, on his own, breaking his vow of stability. Radulfus met Olivier in The Pilgrim of Hate four years earlier, but only now learns he is Cadfael's son. Based on real Abbot of that year.
- Olivier de Bretagne: Young knight in the service of Laurence d’Angers on the side of the Empress, husband of Ermina, who is sister to Yves Hugonin; son of Cadfael and Mariam, half Welsh and half Syrian. He left Antioch when his mother died, when he was 14, knowing his father only from her stories of him, and choosing his father's faith. He is 30 years old. He is a handsome man, disciplined, sane, in control of his feelings, and accomplished in battle. First seen by Cadfael and introduced in The Virgin in the Ice.
- Prior Robert Pennant: Father prior at Shrewsbury Abbey; man of aristocratic tendencies; disapproving of Cadfael's venture, a departure from the strict rule. Based on the real prior of that year.
- Brother Jerome: In penance for his violence earlier in the year (told in The Holy Thief), he is no longer confessor of the novices. He is a chastened man, surprisingly humble, compared to his usual righteous self, failing to complain about Cadfael's request for leave.
- Brother Edmund: Infirmarer, monk who will miss Cadfael as his apothecary.
- Brother Winfrid: Assistant to Cadfael in the herbarium; takes on all the work while Cadfael is away. Introduced in The Hermit of Eyton Forest.
- Brian de Soulis: Castellan of Faringdon under Philip FitzRobert. He turned over the castle to the King in the midst of the siege; led in the King's men by night. He attended the meeting at Coventry. About 32 years old. Real historical person.
- Philip FitzRobert: Castellan of Cricklade and of Faringdon for the Empress; Faringdon was quickly under siege by King Stephen, but no aid was sent by his father, Robert of Gloucester. He was in full agreement with Brien, and fought for the King now. He also holds La Musarderie at Greenhamsted. He is a man of intense feelings, orderly, neat, thorough, with wide range of skills, from reading to war. About 30, the same age as Olivier. Real historical person.
- Yves Hugonin: Man at arms, intelligent and brave, nephew of Laurence d’Angers, serving with his brother-in-law Olivier de Bretagne until recently parted for an errand for the Empress, in which time Faringdon castle fell. He is 19 years old, six years after his first appearance in Cadfael's life when he was introduced in The Virgin in the Ice.
- Roger de Clinton: Bishop of Lichfield, with cathedral also at Coventry, head of the monastery at Lichfield, whose see includes the Shrewsbury Abbey. He offered Coventry for a meeting between King Stephen and Empress Maud and their supporters. Real historical person.
- King Stephen: Attends the meeting convened by Bishop Roger de Clinton, speaks his right to be the king by his coronation and anointing years ago. Brother Cadfael recognises him from once meeting him in Shrewsbury when it was taken (told in One Corpse Too Many); now grey in the King's blond hair. Real historical person.
- Henry, Bishop of Winchester: Younger brother of King Stephen, powerful bishop in England, who often takes over leading the discussion in the meeting at Coventry, an effort he has tried more than once in this long period of contention. Real historical person.
- Empress Maud: Attends the meeting convened by Bishop Roger de Clinton, speaks her right to be the ruler of England, as her father King Henry wished after her only legitimate brother was killed, and as the Earls had sworn when her father was yet alive. Just over 40 years old. Real historical person.
- Robert of Gloucester: Half-brother to the Empress, her most loyal and useful supporter. First-born son to King Henry, but illegitimate, so not a contender for King. His third son Philip, turned his coat abruptly, when his father sent him no aid. Present at the meeting called by the bishops. About 50 years old. Real historical person.
- King David of Scotland: Maternal uncle to Empress Maud, and the King of Scotland. He advises her as part of her close council. Real historical person.
- Robert of Leicester: Earl, son of Robert and twin brother to Waleran, Count of Meulan. Supporter of King Stephen, recent friend to Hugh Beringar. Real historical person.
- Forthred of Todenham: Workman at Deerhurst Abbey, formerly man-at-arms under Brien de Soulis at Faringdon when it was turned over to King Stephen. He is Brother Cadfael's informant as to the owner of the seal found in the saddlebags of Brien de Soulis.
- Geoffrey FitzClare: One of six captains of the common soldiers at Faringdon. His seal was put to the document of agreement changing sides from the Empress to the King; the next day he was brought back dead to the castle. Brother of the Earl of Hertford, illegitimate son (by blow) of the late Earl Richard, in his thirties.
- Lady Jovetta de Montors: Lady's maid to the Empress, a gentlewoman, near 60 years old, widow of Aubrey, who early in their marriage left to fight under Warenne for King Henry in France for two years. She was left with the FitzClare household.
- Isabeau: Attractive and self-possessed niece to Jovetta, about 19 years old, and in the service of the Empress, part of her court of women.
- Guy Camville: Second in command to Philip FitzRobert at La Musarderie castle; negotiates the surrender at Philip's instruction, after Philip is wounded.
- John FitzGilbert: Close advisor to and Marshal for Empress Maud, who speaks for her in the attack on La Musarderie, opening the attack, and accepting the terms from Guy Camville. Real historical person.

== Reviews ==
These reviews were written at the time of publication, before it was known to be the end of the series.

Kirkus Reviews finds this book to be one of the most moving adventures in this series.

Publishers Weekly has high praise for the plot and depiction of strong emotions between friends.

Library Journal sees the increasing popularity of the series of novels.

Booklist from the American Library Association finds the story suspenseful and Cadfael valiant.

== Setting in history ==
The novel takes place in November – December 1145 as the Anarchy is in a phase of stalemate. Neither side can gain enough ground to stop the other from fighting.

On the one hand, Geoffrey of Anjou, husband of the Empress Maud brought his military forces to bear on Normandy being recognised by King Louis VII of France as Duke of Normandy in 1144, where many of Stephen's barons hold land. On the other, King Stephen has recently gained valuable allies in England. After much waffling between the two sides, the powerful Earl of Chester has joined Stephen in a meeting at Stamford. In the Thames Valley, two of the Empress's castellans have defected to Stephen, bringing their castles and garrisons in Faringdon and Cricklade with them, most notably the younger son of Robert of Gloucester, Philip FitzRobert. Philip's story has an interesting parallel with that of William de Dovre.

At the meeting called by Bishop Roger de Clinton, most of the people active on each side of this dispute have speaking lines at the table, or later when advising Empress Maud in Gloucester. Many of the characters in the novel are real historical people, as the backdrop for the personal journey of Brother Cadfael.

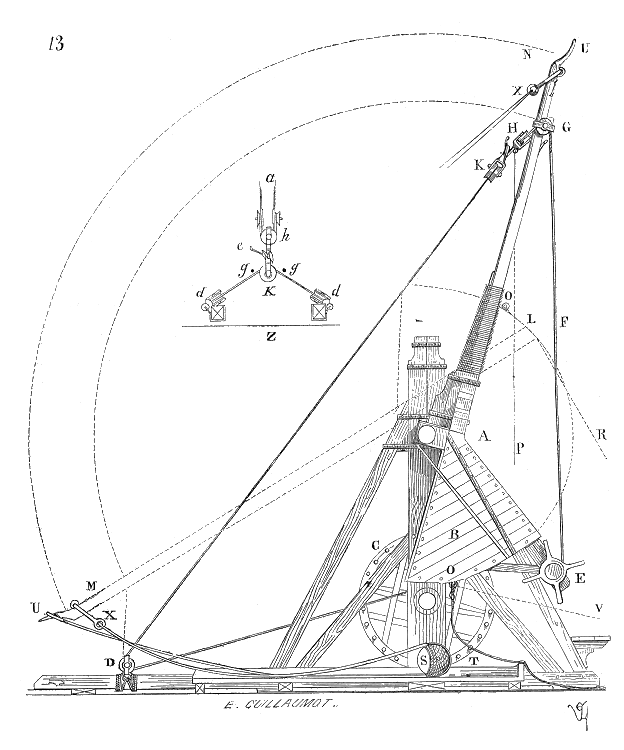
Side view of a mangonel siege engine

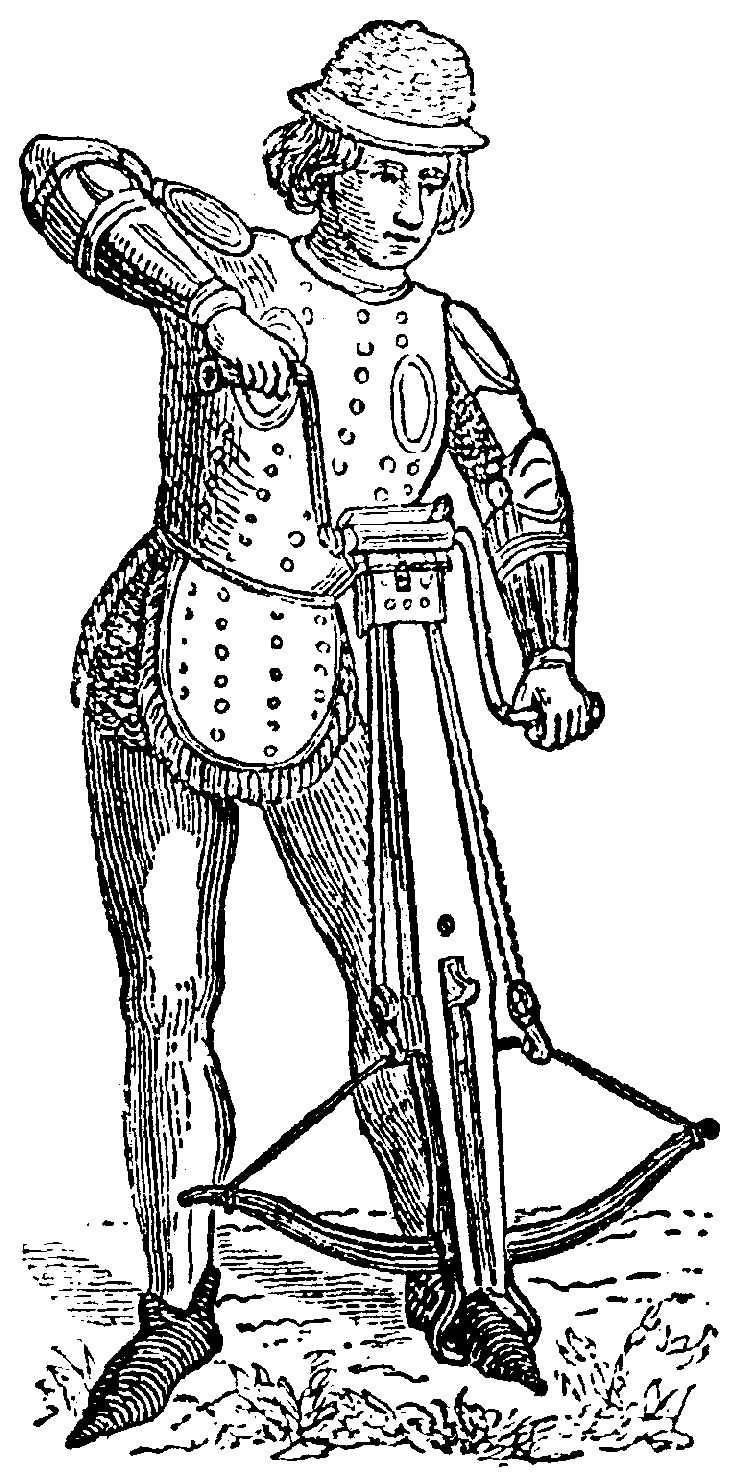
One type of a crossbow – Windlass – in use

This story includes a medieval siege of a castle, lasting over two days, with the largest military force Empress Maud could muster, initially gathered to discuss the implications of the failed peace talks. Such sieges of castles were the common form of warfare in the Anarchy, "war dominated by sieges" per Sarah Speight. Weapons of the time were few, brutal and less precise compared to those of modern times. Man to man combat included swords and daggers. For both attack and defence, siege warfare employed siege engines to project rocks or incendiaries, while defending archers aimed from the crenels or behind arrowslits. Both attacking and defending archers used longbows, self bows or crossbows. Siege warfare in this era favoured the defenders, unless the besiegers were of huge force or could endure long enough to starve the defenders to submission with no other forces coming to the aid of the defenders. Siege engines were used by the defenders of a well-armed castle, as well.

The Fall of Edessa in the Holy Land the previous December in 1144, an event which led to the declaration of the Second Crusade, is much in the air, as bishops across Europe fear for the safety of Jerusalem. Men of England feel this pull to the East, seeking a worthier cause than this tiresome fight in their own nation.

The war over the English crown comes to an effective close three years later, in 1148, when Maud retreats to Normandy after Robert of Gloucester's death. The war is not considered officially over, however, until 1154, when King Stephen dies and Maud's son, Henry, ascends the throne according to the treaty made between Stephen and Henry the year before. Stephen's eldest son Eustace died in 1153 a month after the encounter at Wallingford, and his son William was settled in Normandy, not considered for succession after his father.

The places of the novel are real, including Coventry, Lichfield, Cricklade, Faringdon Castle, La Musarderie near Greenhamsted (now Miserden), the village of Winstone, Bagendon, Cowley, and Deerhurst Abbey, the Augustinian Cirencester Abbey, Evesham Abbey, Leominster Priory and the home of Brother Cadfael, Shrewsbury Abbey.

== Publication history ==
Four hardback editions in English were published, from May 1994 to May 1995. The first edition in May 1994 was published by Headline Book Publishing (ISBN 0-7472-1184-1 / 9781551440590, UK edition), followed by The Mysterious Press in December 1994 (ISBN 0-89296-599-1 / 978-0-89296-599-1, USA edition).

Fourteen paperback editions were listed, first published in 1994 (ISBN 1-55144-078-4 / 9781551440781, USA edition, published by Warner Futura), March 1995 (ISBN 0-7472-4698-X / 978-0-7472-4698-5, UK edition, published by Headline Book Publishing), and the latest in January 2000 from Warner.

Seven audio book editions are listed. The first listed is ISBN 0-7540-5364-4 / 978-0-7540-5364-4, UK edition, published by Chivers Audio Books. The most recent edition was published in December 2006 on CD, with Sir Derek Jacobi as the narrator (ISBN 1-84456-106-2 / 9781844561063, UK edition, published by Hodder & Stoughton) and originally issued on audio cassette in September 1996. Stephen Thorne narrated the US edition in October 2002 (ISBN 1-57270-282-6 / 9781572702820, USA edition, published by The Audio Partners).

There is now a Kindle edition, ISBN B00DYV2NN4.

Editions in other languages have been published.

- Italian: La penitenza di fratello Cadfael, Published 1 January 2006 by Tea Paperback, 220 pages
- French: Frère Cadfael fait pénitence (Frère Cadfael, #20), Published 2002 by 10/18 Mass Market Paperback, 310 pages
- German: Bruder Cadfaels Buße, Published 1 December 1999 by Heyne Paperback (Heyne-Bücher Allgemeine Reihe), 349 pages
