= The Rosery, Exning, Suffolk =

Building in Exning, Suffolk, England

Coordinates: 52.2651°N 0.3745°E

The Rosery Hotel

The Rosery is an early Victorian country house in the town of Exning, Suffolk, England. The building was converted to a hotel in the 1970s.

== Early residents ==
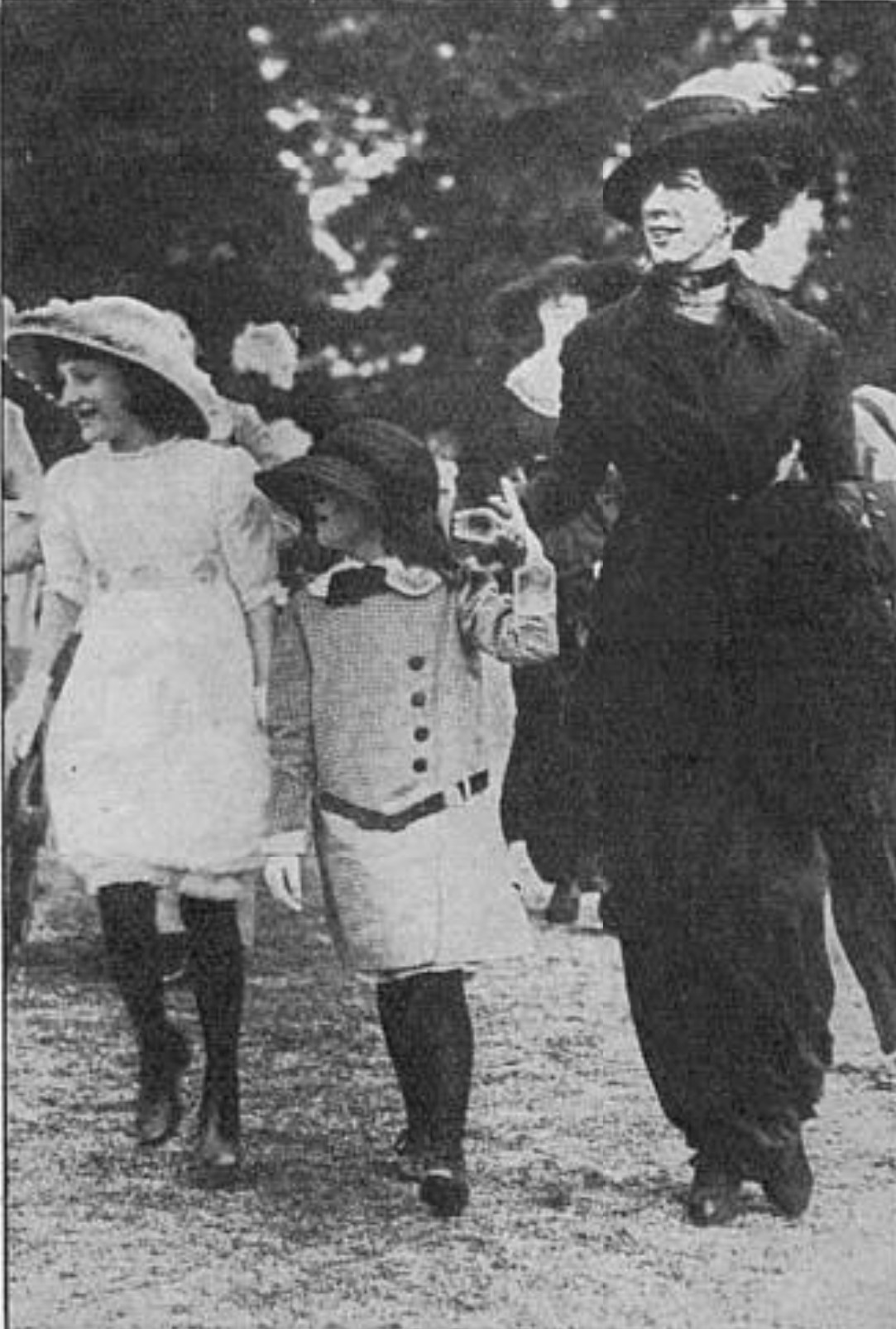
Lady Constance Gore, 1913

One of the early residents was Captain John Mathew (1811–1882), a retired officer of the Leicestershire Militia. He is recorded as the occupant in the 1869 Post Office Directory. He was born in County Tipperary in 1811. His father was a doctor. He was married twice. His first wife was Janette Marsack who died in 1864. His second wife was Matilda Unwin (1821–1910) who he married in Bristol in 1867. The couple appear to have moved into the Rosery shortly after their marriage. They lived there until 1872 and then left to live in Gloucestershire. An advertisement for the sale of their furniture is shown.

The house was rented for many years until about 1883 when William Gardner became the owner. He bought the adjoining property called the Yews and established a horse stud. William Gardner (1854–1936) was born in Manchester in 1854. In 1878 he married Mary Alice Hayhoe (1858–1955) who was the daughter of Joseph Hayhoe, the horseracing trainer appointed by Baron Meyer de Rothschild to be head of the Palace House Stables in Newmarket. The couple had four children while they were living at The Rosery. In 1901 William advertised the property for sale. In the advertisement it was described as a beautifully appointed residence and extensive stud premises suitable for a training establishment.”

By 1909 Colonel Francis William George Gore (1855–1938) and his wife Lady Constance were the owners of the house. They lived there with their four children for the next ten years. Francis Gore was an army officer and first class cricketer. In 1885 he married Lady Constance Grace Milles (1864–1941) who was the daughter of George Milles, 1st Earl Sondes. The couple lived in London but used The Rosery as their country house where they could easily go to the races at Newmarket.

== Later residents ==
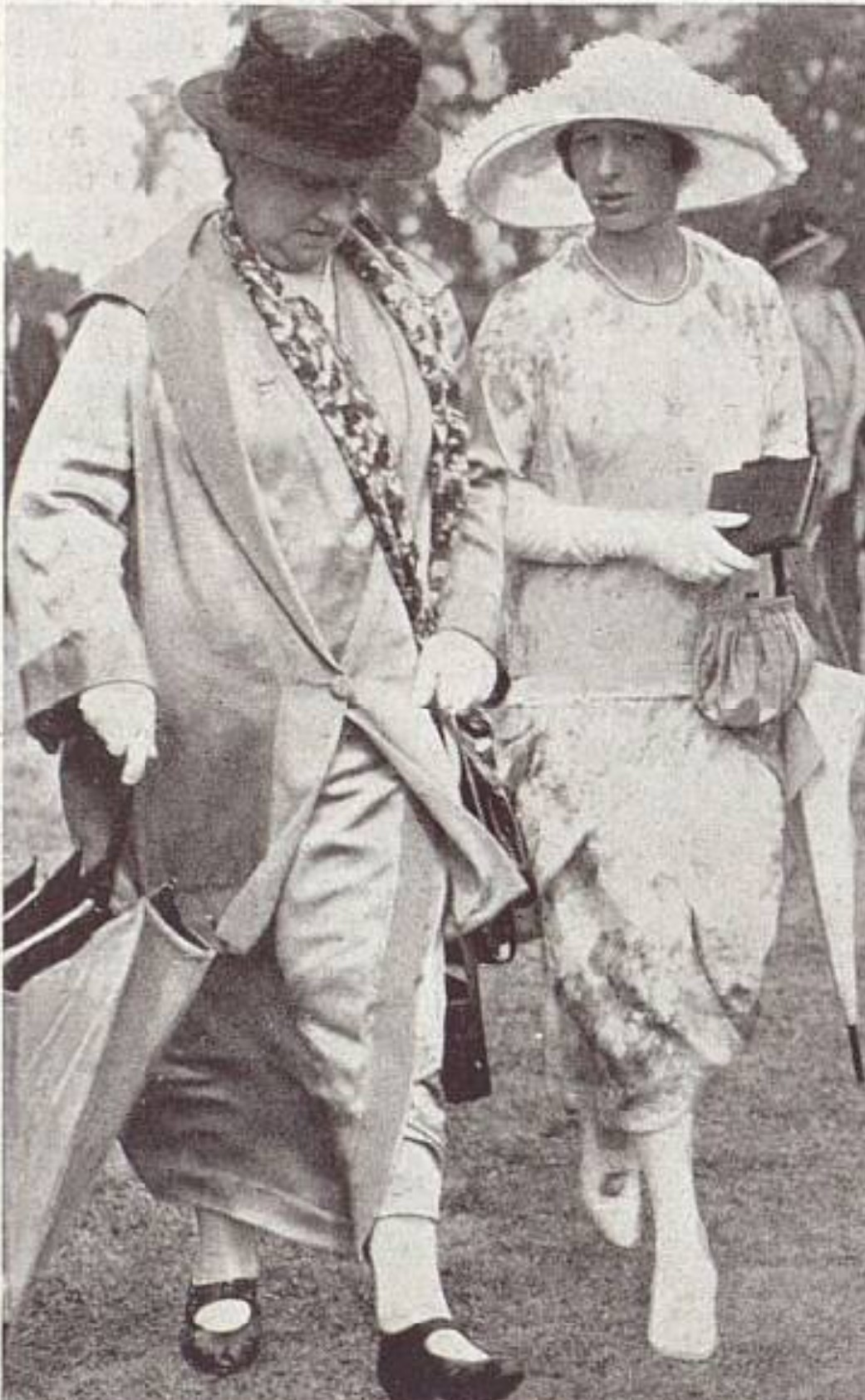
Beatrice Fetherstonhaugh with Princess Mary 1925

The next owner was Captain the Hon. Arnold Nottage Palmer (1886–1973) who was there from about 1918 until about 1930. He made some additions to the house in 1920.

By about 1932 Beatrice Ellerie Fetherstonhaugh (1866–1951) was the owner of The Rosery. She bought it shortly after the death of her husband Major Frederick Howard Wingfield Fetherstonhaugh who was equerry to King George V and the manager of His Majesty’s Thoroughbred Stud.

Beatrice was born in London in 1866. Her father was the Hon. St. Leger Richard Glyn and her grandfather was George Glyn, 1st Baron Wolverton. In 1888 she married Frederick and the couple had two daughters. She and Frederick appear to have been highly regarded by the Royal Family and were invited to many social functions. They lived for some years at Royal Lodge in Windsor Park as a gift of the royal family. The King also seems to have valued Beatrice’s opinions on thoroughbred horses as several letters exist from him to Beatrice in which he thanks her for advice about breeding. After her husband’s death she continued to buy horses for him at Newmarket for his stud at Sandringham. She was also a close friend of Queen Mary and on many occasions The Queen came to visit her for lunch at the Rosery. On some occasions the Queen brought her daughter in law Queen Elizabeth (later the Queen Mother). She is shown in the photo walking with Princess Mary who also befriended her.

Beatrice lived at the Rosery for about 20 years until her death in 1951.

== External reference ==
- The Rosery Hotel website
