= Faringdon Castle =

Castle in England

Coordinates: 51.65930°N 1.57204°W

Faringdon Castle was a Norman castle standing just outside the market town of Faringdon in the English county of Berkshire (administratively now Oxfordshire), some 17 km to the northeast of Swindon (grid reference SU297957).

This castle was built, on a site now known as Folly Hill, by Robert, Earl of Gloucester in, 1144 in support of Matilda in the Anarchy. The Gesta Stephani, a contemporary chronicle, recorded the founding of the castle and the earl's activities, noting that it was "strongly fortified by a rampart and stockade, and putting in it a garrison that was the flower of his whole army he valorously restrained the wonted attacks from the king's soldiers, who had been coming out of Oxford and other castles round about to harass his own side." A few weeks after Faringdon Castle was built it was besieged by Stephen, and after four days, the castellan, Brian De Soulis, surrendered. The castle was destroyed within a year or two.

In the 1930s, a 104 ft brick tower known as Faringdon Folly was built, on the site by Lord Berners.

The story of the castle and Brian de Soulis figures in the last Cadfael Chronicles by Ellis Peters, Brother Cadfael's Penance.

== See also ==
- Castles in Great Britain and Ireland
- List of castles in England
