= Robert de Beaumont, 2nd Earl of Leicester =

English nobleman (1104-1168)

Chief Justiciar of England
- In office October 1155 – 5 April 1168
- Monarch: Henry II
- Preceded by: Roger, Bishop of Salisbury
- Succeeded by: Richard de Luci

Lord High Steward
- In office 1154–1168
- Monarch: Henry II
- Succeeded by: The 3rd Earl of Leicester

Personal details
- Born: 1104
- Died: 5 April 1168 (aged 63–64) Brackley
- Spouse: Amice de Gael
- Relations: Waleran de Beaumont, twin brother
- Children: Hawise, Robert de Beaumont, 3rd Earl of Leicester, Isabel, Margaret
- Parent(s): Robert de Beaumont, Count of Meulan and 1st Earl of Leicester, and Elizabeth de Vermandois

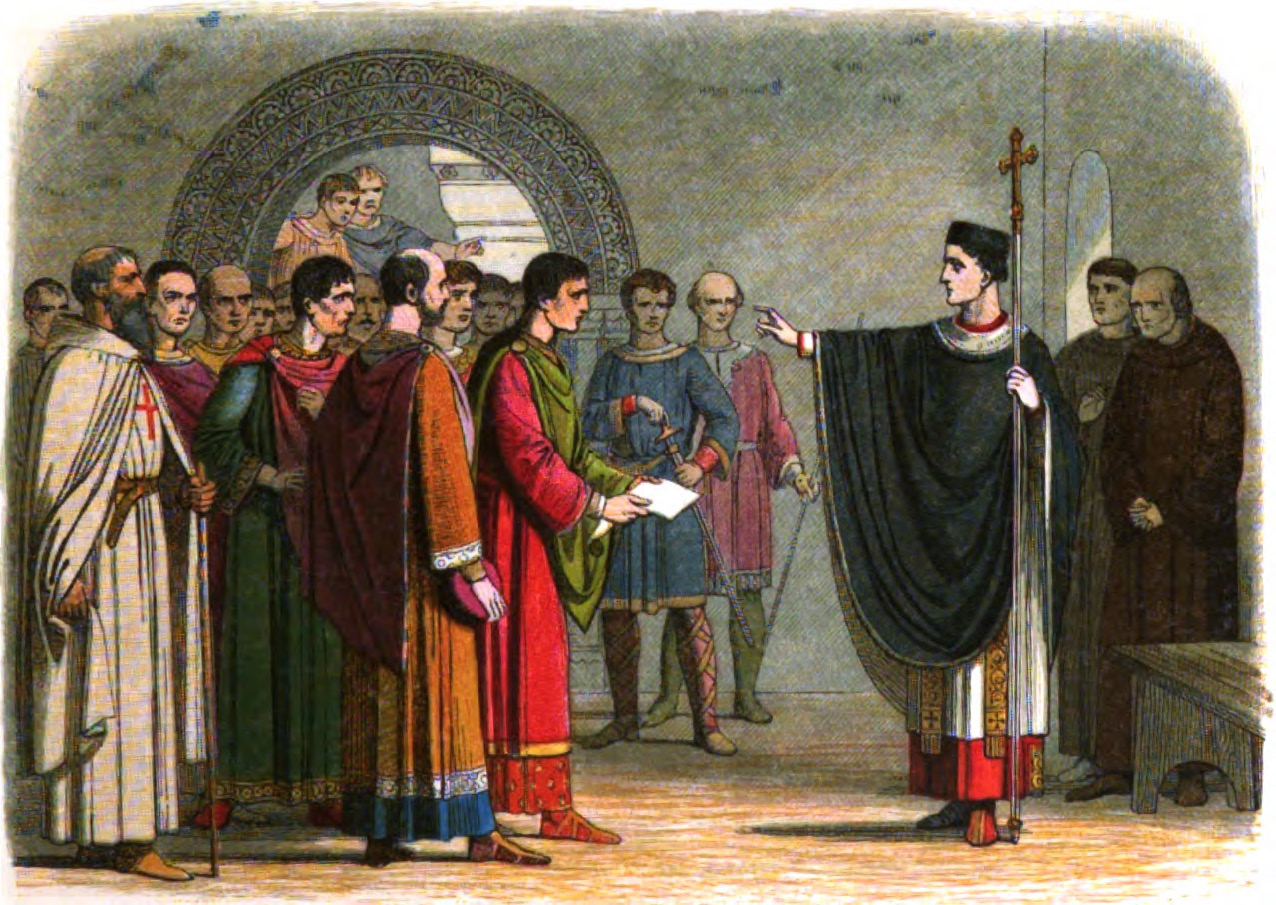
A Chronicle of England - Page 167 - Becket Forbids the Earl of Leceister to Pass Sentence on Him.jpg

Robert de Beaumont, 2nd Earl of Leicester (1104 – 5 April 1168) was Justiciar of England 1155–1168.

The surname "de Beaumont" was given to him by genealogists. The only known contemporary surname applied to him is "Robert son of Count Robert". Henry Knighton, a fourteenth-century chronicler, calls him Robert "Le Bossu" (meaning "Robert the Hunchback" in French). The manuscript Genelogies of the Erles of Lecestre and Chester states that he was "surnamed Boissu", and mentions him by the names Robert Boissu, Robert Beamond and Robert Beaumonde.

== Early life and education ==
Robert was an English nobleman of Norman-French ancestry. He was the son of Robert de Beaumont, Count of Meulan and 1st Earl of Leicester, and Elizabeth de Vermandois, and the twin brother of Waleran de Beaumont. It is not known whether they were identical or fraternal twins, but the fact that they are remarked on by contemporaries as twins probably indicates that they were identical.

The two brothers, Robert and Waleran, were adopted into the royal household shortly after their father's death in June 1118 (upon which Robert inherited his father's second title of Earl of Leicester). Their lands on either side of the Channel were committed to a group of guardians, led by their stepfather, William de Warenne, 2nd Earl of Surrey. They accompanied King Henry I to Normandy, to meet with Pope Callixtus II in 1119, when the king incited them to debate philosophy with the cardinals.

Both twins were literate, and Abingdon Abbey later claimed to have been Robert's school, but though this is possible, its account is not entirely trustworthy. An early treatise on astronomy (the "Leicester Iudicia") carries a dedication "to Earl Robert of Leicester, that man of affairs and profound learning, most accomplished in matters of law" who can only be this Robert. On his death he left his own psalter to the abbey he founded at Leicester, which was still in its library in the late fifteenth century. The existence of this indicates that like many noblemen of his day, Robert followed the canonical hours in his chapel.

== Career at the Norman court ==
In 1120 Robert was declared of age and inherited most of his father's lands in England, while his twin brother took the French lands. However, in 1121 royal favor brought to Robert the great Norman Honors of Breteuil and Pacy-sur-Eure, through his marriage to Amice de Gael, daughter of a Breton noble whom the king had imposed upon the Honor after the forfeiture of the Breteuil family in 1119. Robert spent a good deal of his time and resources over the next decade integrating the troublesome and independent barons of Breteuil into the greater complex of his estates. He did not join in his brother's great Norman rebellion against King Henry I in 1123–24. He appears fitfully at Henry I's royal court (despite his brother's imprisonment) until 1129, but thereafter the twins were frequently there together.

Robert held lands throughout England. During the 1120s and 1130s, he tried to rationalize his estates in Leicestershire. Leicestershire estates of the See of Lincoln and the Earl of Chester were seized by force. This helped to consolidate Robert's various estates in the central midlands, which were bounded by Nuneaton, Loughborough, Melton Mowbray and Market Harborough.

In 1135, the twins were present at King Henry's deathbed. Robert's actions in the succession period are unknown, but he clearly supported his brother's decision to join the court of the new king Stephen before Easter 1136. During the first two years of the reign, Robert is found in Normandy fighting rival claimants for his Honor of Breteuil. Military action allowed him to add the castle of Pont St-Pierre to his Norman estates in June 1136 at the expense of one of his rivals. From the end of 1137, Robert and his brother were increasingly caught up in the politics of the court of King Stephen in England, where Waleran secured an ascendancy that lasted until the beginning of 1141. Robert participated in his brother's political coup against the king's justiciar, Roger of Salisbury (the Bishop of Salisbury).

== Civil war in England ==
The outbreak of civil war in England in September 1139 brought Robert into conflict with Earl Robert of Gloucester, the bastard son of Henry I and principal sponsor of the Empress Matilda. His port of Wareham and estates in Dorset were seized by Gloucester in the first campaign of the war. In that campaign the king awarded Robert the city and castle of Hereford as a bid to establish the earl as his lieutenant in Herefordshire, which was in revolt. It is disputed by scholars whether this was an award of a second county to Earl Robert. Probably late in 1139, Earl Robert refounded his father's collegiate church of St Mary de Castro in Leicester as a major Augustinian abbey on the meadows outside the town's north gate, annexing the college's considerable endowment to the abbey.

The battle of Lincoln on 2 February 1141 saw the capture and imprisonment of King Stephen. Although Count Waleran valiantly continued the royalist fight in England into the summer, he eventually capitulated to the Empress and crossed back to Normandy to make his peace with the Empress's husband, Geoffrey of Anjou. Earl Robert had been in Normandy since 1140 attempting to stem the Angevin invasion, and negotiating the terms of his brother's surrender. He quit Normandy soon after and his Norman estates were confiscated and used to reward Norman followers of the Empress. Earl Robert remained on his estates in England for the remainder of King Stephen's reign. Although he was a nominal supporter of the king, there seems to have been little contact between him and Stephen, who did not confirm the foundation of Leicester Abbey till 1153.

Earl Robert's principal activity between 1141 and 1149 was his private war with Ranulf II, Earl of Chester. Though details are obscure it seems clear enough that he waged a dogged war with his rival, which in the end secured his control of northern Leicestershire and the strategic Chester castle of Mountsorrel. When Earl Robert of Gloucester died in 1147, Robert of Leicester led the movement among the greater earls of England to negotiate private treaties to establish peace in their areas, a process hastened by the Empress's departure to Normandy, and completed by 1149. During this time the earl also exercised supervision over his twin brother's earldom of Worcester, and in 1151 he intervened to frustrate the king's attempts to seize the city.

== Earl Robert and Henry Plantagenet ==
The arrival in England of Duke Henry, son of the Empress Matilda, in January 1153 was a great opportunity for Earl Robert. He was probably in negotiation with Henry in that spring, and reached an agreement under which he defected to him by May 1153, when the duke restored his Norman estates to the earl. The duke celebrated his Pentecost court at Leicester in June 1153, and he and the earl were constantly in company until the peace settlement between the duke and the king at Winchester in November 1153. Earl Robert crossed with the duke to Normandy in January 1154 and resumed his Norman castles and honours. As part of the settlement, his claim to be chief steward of England and Normandy was recognised by Henry.

Earl Robert began his career as chief justiciar of England probably as soon as Duke Henry succeeded as King Henry II in October 1154. The office gave the earl supervision of the administration and legal process in England whether the king was present in, or absent from the realm. He appears in that capacity in numerous administrative acts, and had a junior colleague in the post in Richard de Luci, another former servant of King Stephen. The earl filled the office for nearly fourteen years until his death, and earned the respect of the emerging Angevin bureaucracy in England. His opinion was quoted by learned clerics, and his own learning was highly commended.

He died on 5 April 1168, probably at his Northamptonshire castle of Brackley, for his entrails were buried at the hospital in the town. He was received as a canon of Leicester on his deathbed, and buried to the north of the high altar of the great abbey he had founded and built. He left a written testament of which his son the third earl was an executor, as we learn in a reference dating to 1174.

== Church patronage ==
Robert founded and patronised many religious establishments. He founded Leicester Abbey (1144) and Garendon Abbey (1133) in Leicestershire, the Fontevraldine Nuneaton Priory in Warwickshire, Luffield Priory in Northamptonshire, and made endowments to the hospital of Brackley, Northamptonshire. He refounded the collegiate church of St Mary de Castro, Leicester, as a dependency of Leicester Abbey around 1164, after suppressing it in 1139. Around 1139 he refounded the collegiate church of Wareham as a priory of his Abbey of Lyre, in Eure, Normandy. His principal Norman foundations were the priory of Nôtre-Dame du Désert in the Forest of Breteuil, and a major hospital in Breteuil itself (Eure). He was a generous benefactor of the Benedictine Abbey of Lyre, the oldest monastic house in the Honour of Breteuil. He also donated land in Old Dalby, Leicestershire to the Knights Hospitallers who used it to found Dalby Preceptory.

About the year 1150, Robert le Bossu, Earl of Leicester, gave to one Solomon, a clerk, an acre of land at Brackley on which to build a house of hospitality for the poor, together with a free chapel and graveyard.

== Family and children ==
Robert married after 1120 Amice de Gael, daughter of Raoul II de Gael, himself a son of Ralph de Gael, Earl of East Anglia and Emma Fitz Osborn Both families had lost their English inheritances through rebellion in 1075. They had four children:

1. Hawise de Beaumont, who married William Fitz Robert, 2nd Earl of Gloucester and had descendants.
2. Robert de Beaumont, 3rd Earl of Leicester who married Petronilla de Grandmesnil and had descendants.
3. Isabel, who married Simon de St. Liz, Earl of Huntingdon and had descendants. She then remarried to baron Gervase Paganell.
4. Margaret, who married Ralph IV de Tosny and had descendants through their daughter, Ida de Tosny.

== Literary references ==
He is a major character in The Holy Thief and a minor character in Brother Cadfael's Penance, of the Brother Cadfael series by Ellis Peters. He is also a major character in Cecelia Holland's novel The Earl.

== Sources ==
- D. Crouch, The Beaumont Twins: the Roots and Branches of Power in the Twelfth Century (Cambridge 1986).
- D. Crouch, The Reign of King Stephen, 1135-1154 (London 2000).
- E. King, "Mountsorrel and its region in King Stephen's Reign", Huntington Library Quarterly, 44 (1980), 1–10.
- J. Storey, J. Bourne and R. Buckley (eds), Leicester Abbey (Leicester 2006).
- Powicke, F. Maurice and E. B. Fryde, Handbook of British Chronology 2nd edition (Royal Historical Society, London 1961).
- British Library MS Royal 12.E.XXV.
- U Penn Ms. Codex 1070: "Genelogies Of The Erles Of Lecestre And Chester"

Political offices
Preceded by —	Lord High Steward; 1154–1168	Succeeded by Robert de Beaumont, 3rd Earl of Leicester
Preceded by Roger, Bishop of Salisbury; Held the office without the title	Chief Justiciar; 1154–1168	Succeeded by Richard de Luci
Peerage of England
Preceded by Robert de Beaumont	Earl of Leicester; 1118–1168	Succeeded by Robert de Beaumont
