= Siege of Dol =

Siege in September 1076

The Siege of Dol took place in September 1076 during a campaign against rebels based at Dol in Brittany.

After the failure of the Revolt of the Earls in England in 1075, the rebel Ralph de Gael, Earl of Norfolk, who already held land in Brittany, fled there where he joined a rebellion against the Duke Hoël II seized the castle at Dol, also menacing Normandy's western border. William the Conqueror, who had previously fought Ralph, took an army from England to besiege Ralph in Dol in support of Hoël, but with winter approaching the siege was lifted when King Philip I of France and Fulk of Anjou intervened with a relieving army, inflicting William's first recorded military defeat. A peace settlement reached in 1077 at Orléans left Ralph in possession of Dol. The setback damaged William's prestige, although there is disagreement among historians who have argued that it hurt him in France and those who claimed it had little long-term political impact.

== Sources ==
- Bates, David (2001). William the Conqueror. Kings and Queens of Medieval England. Stroud, UK: Tempus. ISBN 0-7524-1980-3.
- Blomefield, Francis (1806). ""The city of Norwich, chapter 5: Of the city in the Conqueror's time." An Essay Towards A Topographical History of the County of Norfolk: Volume 3, the History of the City and County of Norwich, Part I". British History Online. London: W Miller. pp. 14–21.
- Chisholm, Hugh, ed. (1911). "Ralph de Guader" . Encyclopædia Britannica. Vol. 22 (11th ed.). Cambridge University Press. p. 872.
- Douglas, David C. (1964). William the Conqueror: The Norman Impact Upon England. Berkeley, CA: University of California Press. OCLC 399137.
- Keats-Rohan, Katharine (1992). "The Bretons and Normans of England 1066-1154" Nottingham Medieval Studies (PDF). Archived from the original (PDF) on 2011-07-24.
- Morris, Marc (2012). The Norman Conquest: The Battle of Hastings and the Fall of Anglo-Saxon England. New York: Random House. ISBN 978-1-4481-3602-5.
- Petit-Dutaillis, Charles (1936). The Feudal Monarchy in France and England:From the 10th to the 13th Century. Translated by Hunt, E.D. Routledge. OL 27789341M.
- Stenton, Frank M. (1908). William the Conqueror and the Rule of the Normans.
- Williams, Ann (23 September 2004). "Ralph [called Ralph de Gael, Ralph Guader]". Oxford Dictionary of National Biography (online ed.). Oxford University Press. (Subscription, Wikipedia Library access or UK public library membership required.)
