= William FitzOsbern, 1st Earl of Hereford =

Norman earl (c. 1011–1071)

The Earl of Hereford
- Coat of arms of William FitzOsbern
- Born: c. 1011
- Died: 22 February 1071 (aged 60–61); Flanders
- Cause of death: War
- Known for: Lord of Breteuil; Earl of Hereford; companion of William the Conqueror
- Title: The Earl of Hereford; Lord of Breteuil
- Spouse: Adeliza de Tosny
- Children: William of Breteuil; Roger de Breteuil; Emma de Breteuil
- Parent(s): Osbern the Steward and Emma of Ivry
- Relatives: Rodulf of Ivry (maternal grandfather); Osbern FitzOsbern (brother)

William FitzOsbern, 1st Earl of Hereford, Lord of Breteuil (c. 1011 – 22 February 1071), was a relative and close counsellor of William the Conqueror and one of the great magnates of early Norman England. FitzOsbern was created Earl of Hereford in 1067, (Note: Fitz Osbern's entry in the Oxford Dictionary of National Biography questions whether he was earl of Hereford: "He was not even 'earl of Hereford', as he appears in most historical writing. The king certainly made him an earl (comes) in England in 1067, but the title was personal, not territorial, and he had comital authority not just over Herefordshire but probably throughout the southern shires where Harold Godwineson had been earl.") one of the first titles in the English peerage. He is one of the very few proven companions of William the Conqueror known to have fought at the Battle of Hastings in 1066. His chief residence was Carisbrooke Castle on the Isle of Wight, one of many castles he built in England.

== Origins ==
William FitzOsbern was the son of Osbern the Steward, a nephew of Duchess Gunnor, the wife of Duke Richard I of Normandy. Osbern was the steward of his cousin Duke Robert I of Normandy. When Robert left the Duchy to his young son William, Osbern became one of Duke William's guardians. Osbern married Emma, a daughter of Count Rodulf of Ivry, who was a half-brother of Duke Richard I of Normandy. Through her he inherited a large property in central Normandy, including the honours of Pacy and Breteuil.

== Career pre-1066 ==
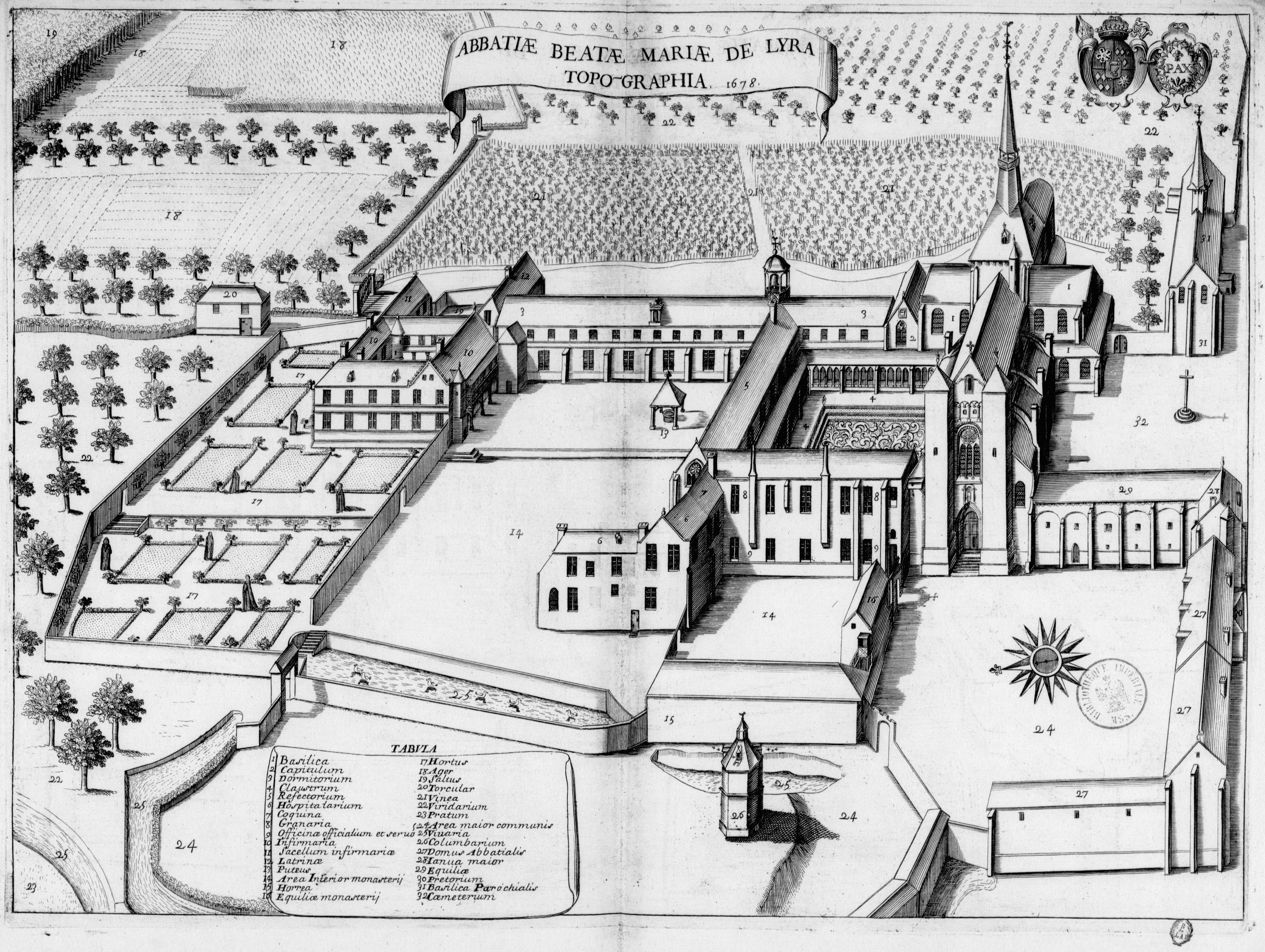
A 17th-century depiction of Lyre Abbey in Normandy, which was founded by FitzOsbern and his wife, Adeliza.

William FitzOsbern was probably raised at the court of his cousin William, Duke of Normandy, and like his father, became one of the ducal stewards. (Note: In Normandy, he used the title comes palatii, count of the palace. Historian C. P. Lewis observed that "Historians writing in the nineteenth century and for much of the twentieth called William a 'palatine earl', an inappropriate translation of the title which he had used in Normandy; there were no palatine earldoms in England until the thirteenth century.") He married Adeliza de Tosny, probably in about 1030. Together they founded Lyre Abbey (La Vieille-Lyre) and later Cormeilles Abbey. FitzOsbern also founded Saint-Evroul Abbey.

He was one of the earliest and most vigorous advocates of the invasion of England, and tradition holds that, at the Council of Lillebonne, he convinced the doubters amongst the Norman barons of the feasibility of the invasion. FitzOsbern's younger brother Osbern FitzOsbern was one of Edward the Confessor's chaplains, and possessed the rich church of Bosham in Sussex, where King Harold went to in the first scene of the Bayeux Tapestry, and was well placed to pass along intelligence on the situation in England. He later became Bishop of Exeter.

== In England after 1066 ==
After William became King of England, FitzOsbern was made an earl, with major land holdings in Gloucestershire, Herefordshire, Oxfordshire, and the Isle of Wight, and smaller areas under his authority in Berkshire, Dorset, Wiltshire, and Worcestershire. In the summer of 1067 King William returned to Normandy and left his half-brother Bishop Odo of Bayeux and FitzOsbern in charge of England during his absence. The king was back in England in 1068 and FitzOsbern accompanied him in the subjugation of south-west England. He attended the King's Whitsun court in May 1068, and then visited Normandy, where he fell ill for some months.

In February or March 1069 FitzOsbern was asked by William to oversee the peace in York, where Gilbert de Ghent was made castellan of the new castle, but FitzOsbern returned south in time to attend the King's Easter court in April 1069 before returning to York.

Eadric the Wild launched a campaign of Anglo-Saxon resistance in the West Midlands, with the assistance of a number of Welsh princes (who had lately been allies of the Anglo-Saxon kings). In 1069 the revolt was crushed, and it is likely FitzOsbern played a major part in this, although the details are not certain. During this time FitzOsbern and his followers pushed on westwards into Wales, thus beginning the Norman conquest of the Welsh Kingdom of Gwent.

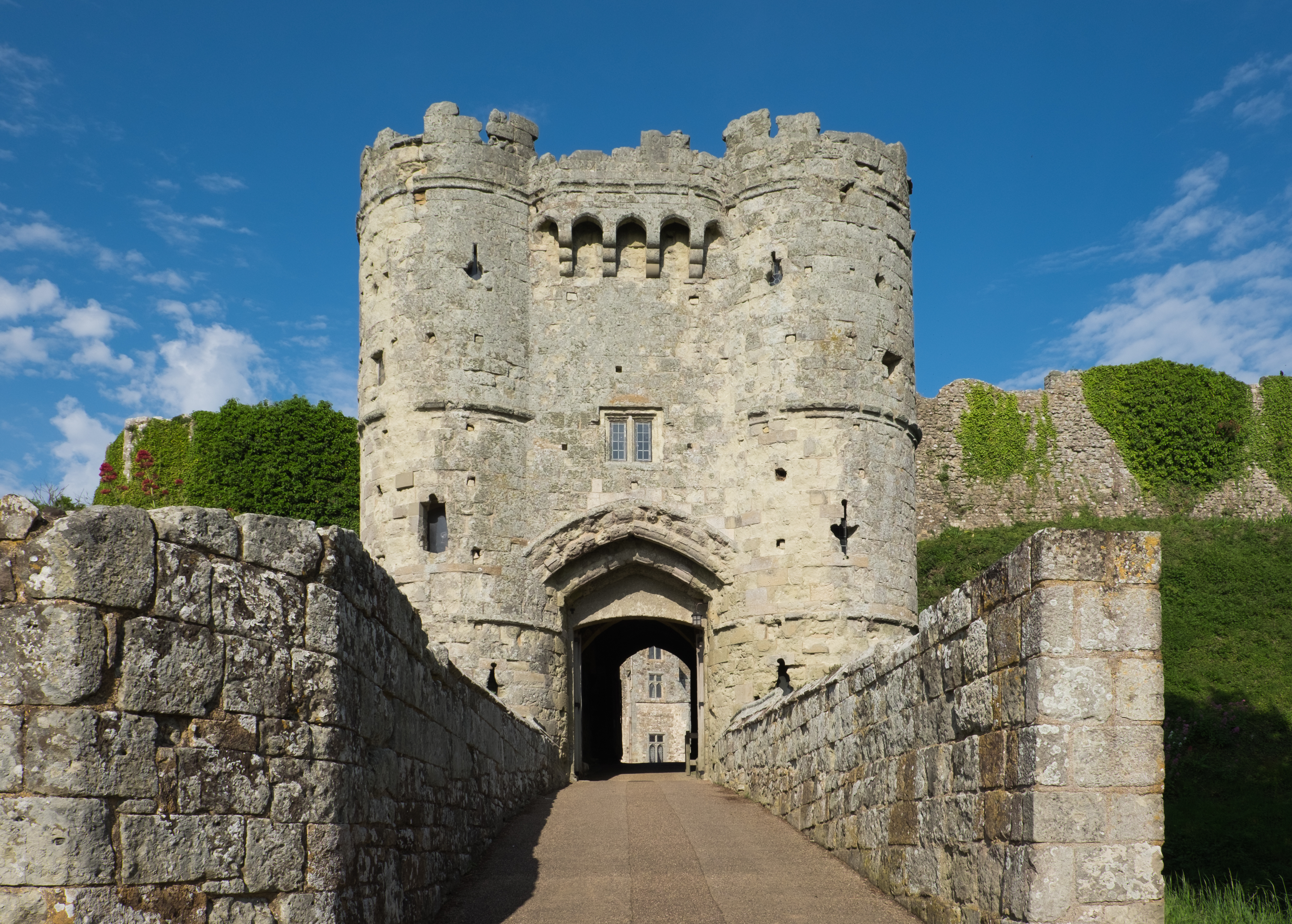
Carisbrooke Castle gatehouse

=== Castle builder ===
As part of the assertion of Norman control over England and Wales, FitzOsbern was one of the major Norman castle builders. Early castles attributed to him include Carisbrooke Castle on the Isle of Wight, Chepstow Castle (Striguil) in South Wales, Snodhill Castle, Wigmore Castle and Clifford Castle in Herefordshire, Berkeley Castle in Gloucestershire and Monmouth Castle in Wales. FitzOsbern also created or improved fortifications in the towns of Hereford and Shrewsbury.

=== Distraction and death in Flanders ===
In 1070 trouble arose in Flanders, where King William's brother-in-law Count Baldwin VI of Flanders had died, leaving his county and his young sons in the hands of his widow Richilde, Countess of Mons and Hainaut. Her control of Flanders was challenged by the brother of her late husband, Robert the Frisian. Looking for help, she offered herself in marriage to FitzOsbern. He could not resist the chance to become also Count of this rich principality close to Normandy, and hurried there with his army. However, he was defeated by the Count of Flanders and killed in the Battle of Cassel on 22 February 1071.

== Marriages and children ==
FitzOsbern married twice:

- Firstly to Adeliza de Tosny, daughter of Roger I of Tosny, by whom he had four children:
  - William of Breteuil, who succeeded his father in Normandy. He was held captive and tortured by Ascelin Gouel de Perceval 'Lupus', Sire d'Yvry, until he finally granted his daughter Isabella de Breteuil in marriage to him.
  - Roger de Breteuil, 2nd Earl of Hereford, who succeeded his father in England and Wales;
  - Emma de Breteuil, wife of Ralph de Gael, 1st Earl of Norfolk and William de Vernon.
  - Adela married John, Lord of Croy
- Secondly, it is assumed he married Richilde, Countess of Mons and Hainaut in 1070, shortly before the Battle of Cassel. They had a son who was taken to the Burgundy region of Savoy.
  - Godfrey de Crepon Candie

== Cultural depictions ==
A fictional version of FitzOsbern is portrayed by Ingvar Eggert Sigurðsson in the 2025 TV series King & Conqueror.

== Notes ==
Preceded by New Creation	Earl of Hereford	Succeeded by Roger de Breteuil
