= Buildwas Abbey =

Monastery in Shropshire, England

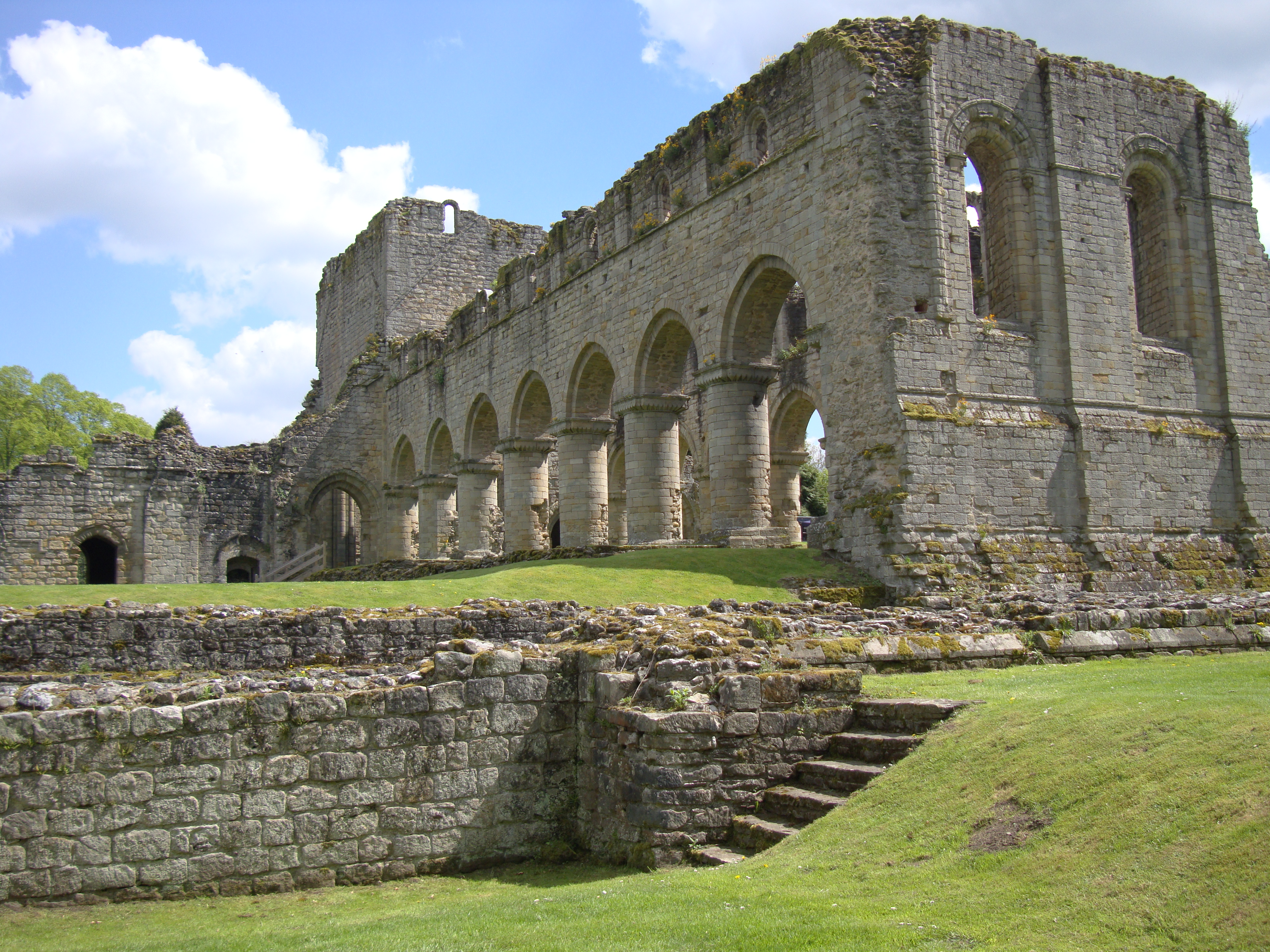
- Buildwas Abbey, Shropshire.

- Location within Shropshire

Monastery information
- Full name: Monastery of St Mary and St Chad of Buildwas
- Other name: Communis Monasterii Sancte Marie de Buldewas
- Order: Cistercian, originally Savigniac
- Established: 1135
- Disestablished: 1536
- Mother house: Savigny Abbey
- Dedication: St Mary and St Chad
- Diocese: Coventry and Lichfield
- Controlled churches: St. Mary's Abbey, Dublin, daughter house; Basingwerk Abbey, daughter house; St Mary's, Leighton, appropriated

People
- Founders: Roger de Clinton, Bishop of Coventry and Lichfield
- Important associated figures: William FitzAlan, Lord of Oswestry; Abbot Ranulf; Stephen of Lexington; Robert Burnell; Edmund Crouchback; Robert de Ferrers, 6th Earl of Derby; Richard FitzAlan, 10th Earl of Arundel; Hugh Burnell, 2nd Lord Burnell; George Talbot, 4th Earl of Shrewsbury; Edward Grey, 3rd Baron Grey of Powis

Site
- Location: Buildwas, near Ironbridge, Telford, Shropshire, TF8 7BW
- Coordinates: 52.6354°N 2.5284°W
- Grid reference: grid reference SJ642044
- Visible remains: Substantial remains of church and claustral buildings.

Scheduled monument
- Official name: Buildwas Abbey
- Designated: 8 February 1915
- Reference no.: 1015813
- Public access: Free entry, 10:00–17:00 every day.

Buildwas Abbey was a Cistercian (originally Savigniac) monastery located on the banks of the River Severn, at Buildwas in Shropshire, England - today about 2 miles (3.2 km) west of Ironbridge. Founded by the local bishop in 1135, it was sparsely endowed at the outset but enjoyed several periods of growth and increasing wealth: notably under Abbot Ranulf in the second half of the 12th century and again from the mid-13th century, when large numbers of acquisitions were made from the local landed gentry. Abbots were regularly used as agents by the Plantagenet monarchs in their attempts to subdue Ireland and Wales and the abbey acquired a daughter house in each country.

It was a centre of learning, with a substantial library, and was noted for its discipline until the economic and demographic crises of the 14th century brought about decline and difficulties, exacerbated by conflict and political instability in the Welsh Marches. The abbey was suppressed in 1536 as part of the dissolution of the monasteries under Henry VIII. Substantial remains of the abbey church and monks' quarters remain and are in the care of English Heritage.

== Foundation ==
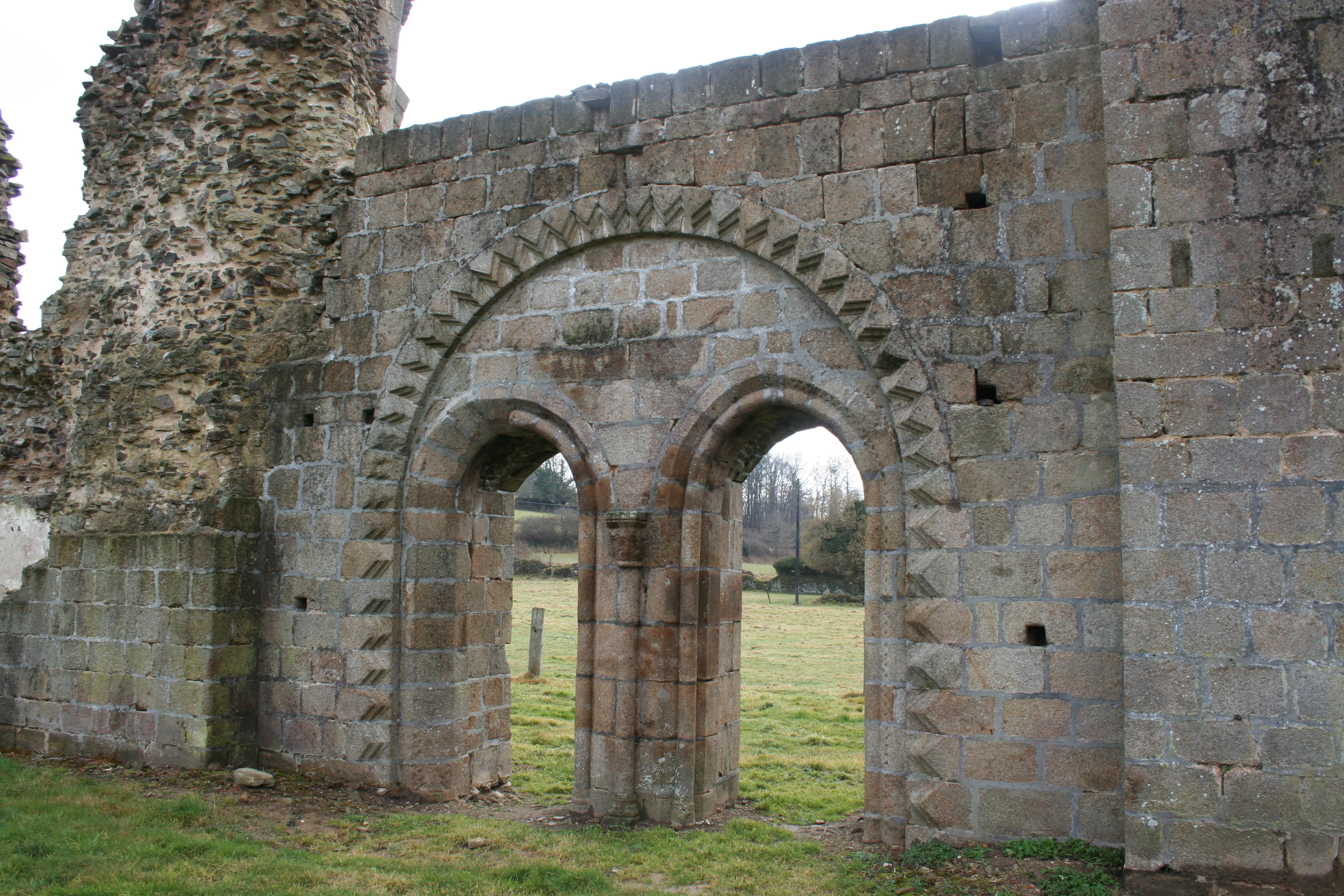
Remains of Savigny Abbey, mother house of Buildwas.

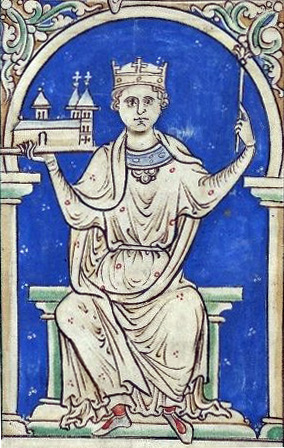
13th-century depiction of King Stephen, who confirmed Buildwas Abbey's early charters.

Buildwas Abbey was a Cistercian house, although originally founded as a Savigniac monastery in 1135 by Roger de Clinton (1129–1148), Bishop of Coventry and Lichfield. The short-lived Savigniac congregation was a reformed and ascetic branch of the Benedictine Order, centred on the Abbey of Savigny in Normandy, and dating only from 1112.

Buildwas manor was land previously belonging to the diocese. In the Domesday Book the manor of Buildwas was assessed as one hide and was home to nine households, five of them headed by slaves, four by villeins and one by the reeve. It had a mill and woodland, with 200 pigs. It was then worth 45 shillings, as before the Norman Conquest of England, although the value had slipped a little in the intervening period. The dedication of the abbey was to St Mary and St Chad: the same as Lichfield Cathedral. The foundation charter itself has been lost, but a poor transcription survives among the manuscripts of Roger Dodsworth, now in the Bodleian Library. This was printed by Robert William Eyton, the great Shropshire antiquarian, who considered that the list of witnesses, including parties who were soon afterwards drawn into the civil strife of King Stephen's reign on opposing sides, was designed to suggest an early date for the document – an impression he considered false. The first abbot is named as Ingenulf. The transcript omits details of the bishop's grants to the new abbey. However, these are listed in a confirmation issued by Richard I. Like the transcript, this addresses Roger de Clinton as Bishop of Chester and states that his donation was of Buildwas itself, with its surrounding woodland, assarts and appurtenances; land at Meole, just south of Shrewsbury, with its burgesses and a due (tax) called greffegh; churchscot, a due for the support of the clergy, from the hundreds of Condover and Wrockwardine; et in territorio Licheffelddensi hominem unum nomine Edricum ("in the territory of Lichfield one man named Edric"). Edric's rôle is not specified but presumably involved some kind of work on the abbey's behalf in the diocesan centre.

The earlier confirmation by King Stephen, issued apparently while he was involved in the siege of Shrewsbury in 1138, gave few details of the grants, although it did give the size of the site as one hide, as in Domesday. Instead it concentrated on recognising the abbey's immunity from taxes and other exactions, including scot and lot and Danegeld. Stephen was a strong supporter and promoter of the Savigniac community, whose mother house stood within his own county of Mortain, which he lost to the Angevins during the Anarchy. One of the witnesses of Stephen's confirmation was Philip de Belmeis, an important Shropshire landholder. Together with his wife, Matilda, Philip subsequently made an important grant to the abbey of land at Ruckley in Tong, with common pasture and pannage in his woods towards Brewood and the Lizard. The grant is not dated but makes clear that the abbey was still part of the Savigniac community, as it committed all Savigniac houses to pray for Philip, Matilda and their family. The Savigniac houses were all absorbed into the Cistercian order in 1147, and the merger was confirmed by a bull of Pope Eugenius III on 11 April 1148. By this time Philip had transferred his support to the rival Augustinians, granting lands which allowed the establishment of Lilleshall Abbey.

== Era of growth under Abbot Ranulf ==
Buildwas Abbey was initially quite small and poor, as its early endowments were not great in total, even if, as seems likely, it received its grant of Little Buildwas, across the river from the monastery, from William FitzAlan, Lord of Oswestry, in its early years: the original charter is lost and the grant is known from the second William FitzAlan's later confirmation. Ingenulf, the first abbot, was fairly obscure, but the abbey entered a period of growth and development under Abbot Ranulf, who is known to have taken over by 1155, since a charter relating to Lilleshall which he witnessed cannot be later than that year. His abbacy coincided very closely with the reign of Henry II.

=== Financial and cultural advance ===
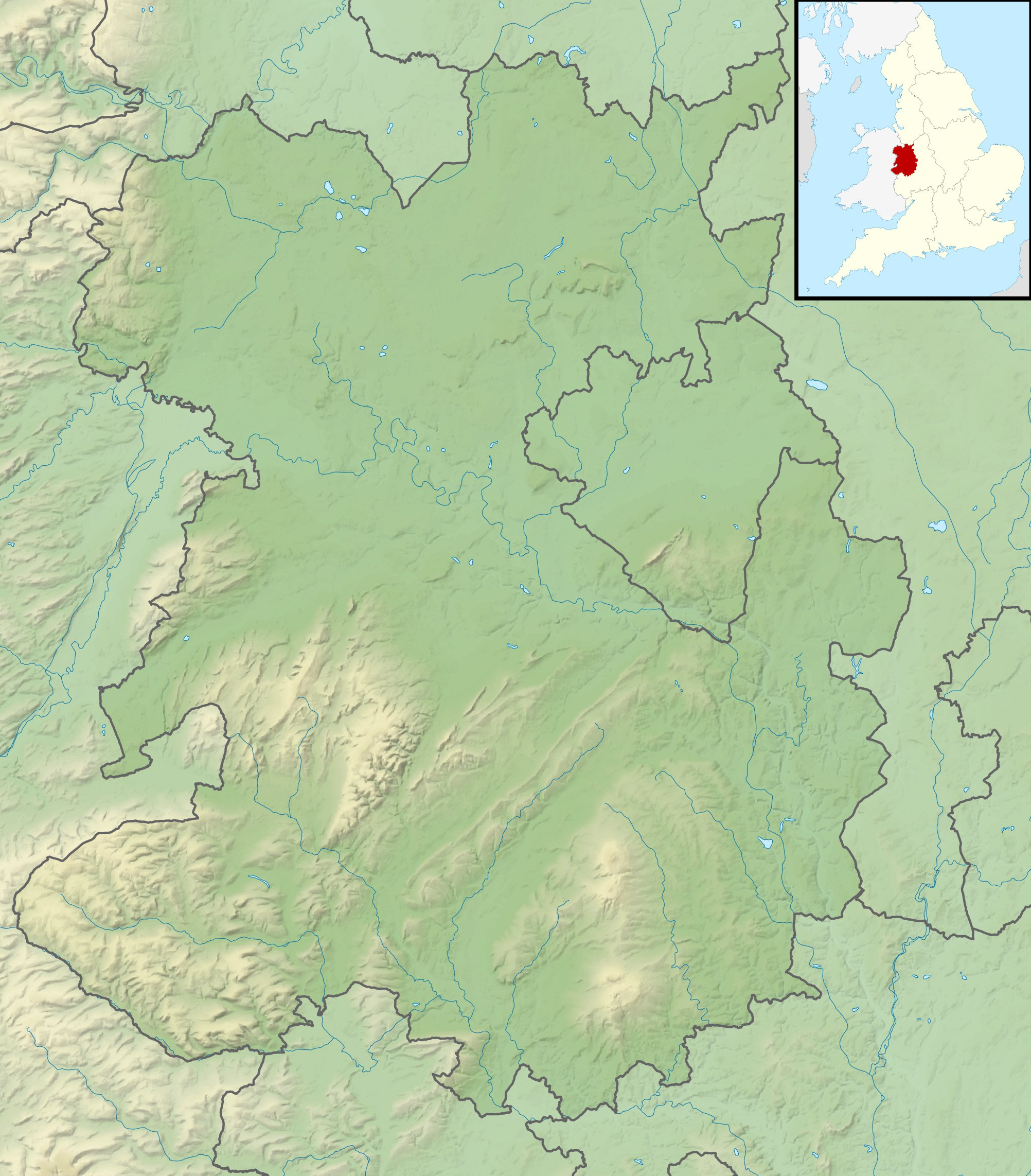
Relief map of Shropshire showing locations of nearby estates held by Buildwas Abbey in 1189.

Richard I's confirmation of the abbey's lands, issued from the hand of his chancellor, William de Longchamp in 1189, two years after Ranulf's death, suggests that considerable progress had been made in acquiring land and other sources of income during his abbacy. In addition to the early endowments, it lists Bishop Richard Peche's grants of a messuage in the Foregate at Chester and of a mill worth four shillings at Burne (possibly Burntwood) near Lichfield; Brocton, Staffordshire, from Gerald of Brockton and his son; Richard of Pitchford's gift of the services of a man called Richard Crasset, who lived at Cosford, Shropshire; half of Hatton, south of Shifnal, from Adam of Hatton and Reginald, his son; half of Walton, Staffordshire from Walter Fitz Herman; land at Ivonbrook Grange, near Grangemill in Derbyshire, from Henry Fitz Fulk; land at Cauldon in north-west Staffordshire from William of Cauldon; and a house from Robert Fitz Thomas, although the location is partially erased.

The increasing wealth of the abbey was probably reflected in the enrichment of its library. Oxford University's database of the medieval libraries of Great Britain records 57 volumes that belonged at some time to the library at Buildwas, including two that subsequently found their way to St George's Chapel, Windsor Castle, although Trinity College, Cambridge has by far the largest collection of former Buildwas books. Seventeen of the 57 are definitively dated to the 12th century and a further six possibly so. Two are internally dated to the time of Ranulf. One of these is a copy of works of Augustine of Hippo, with its attribution to Buildwas Abbey and the date 1167 written above the title in red and black letters. A glossed copy of the Book of Leviticus has the date 1179 on the 7th folio.

The additional income must also have played a major part in the decision to press ahead with construction of up-to-date stone buildings for the monastic community.

=== Construction of the abbey ===
There is no documentary evidence of the construction of the abbey at Buildwas, but it seems to have lagged a little behind Kirkstall Abbey, now in a Leeds suburb, which was built probably between 1152 and about 1170. Buildwas and Kirkstall are of the simplest and earliest pattern of Cistercian churches in Britain and are broadly comparable. In both cases, the builders became more adventurous as they progressed toward the west from the eastern end of the church. Both churches have a stone tower over the crossing, although this was forbidden by the General Chapter of the Cistercians in 1157. The presbytery at Buildwas was without aisles and the aisles of the nave had wooden ceilings, rather than the more elaborate vaulting found in later buildings. The piers of the aisles are also simple cylinders. While still definitely Romanesque, Buildwas has details in the design of capitals, bases and windows which prefigure the transition to Gothic architecture that came a little later. The church building and monks’ quarters were constructed in local sandstone and completed within the century: the infirmary and abbot's lodging were still under construction around 1220, or perhaps not yet started, when the abbey gained access to the stone quarries and timber of nearby Broseley.

=== Daughter houses ===
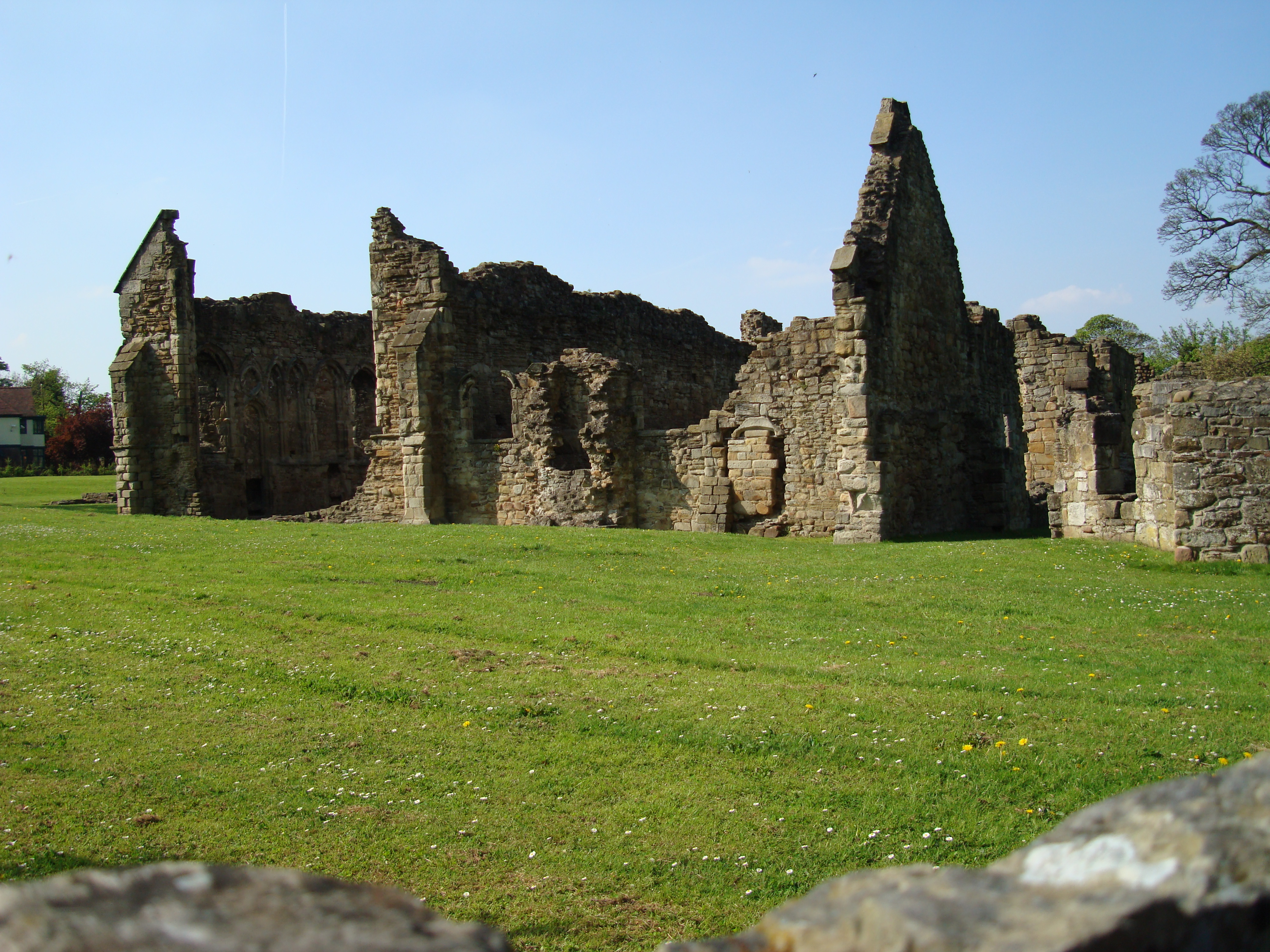
Ruins of Basingwerk Abbey.

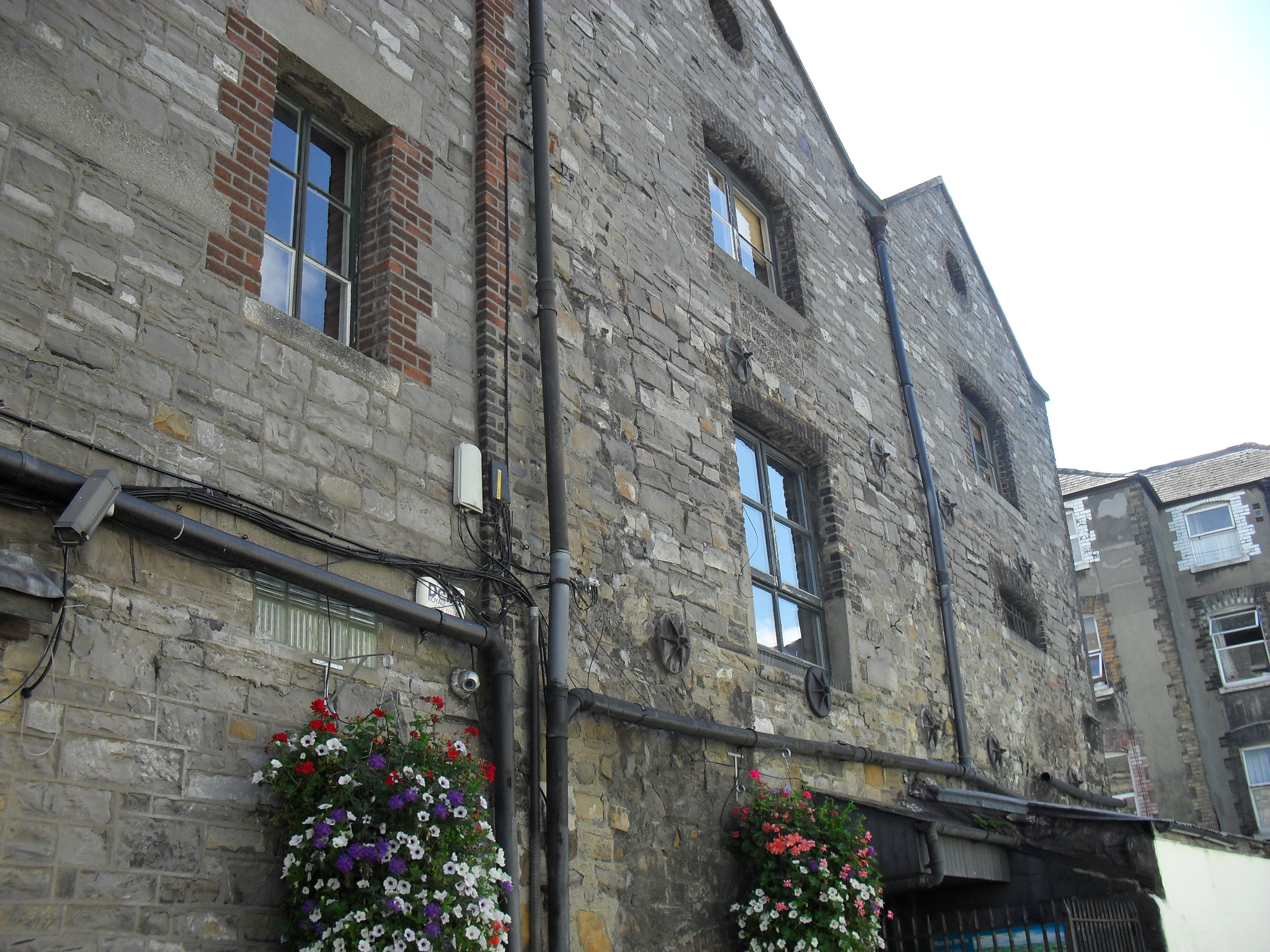
Exterior of chapter house, St Mary's Abbey, Dublin.

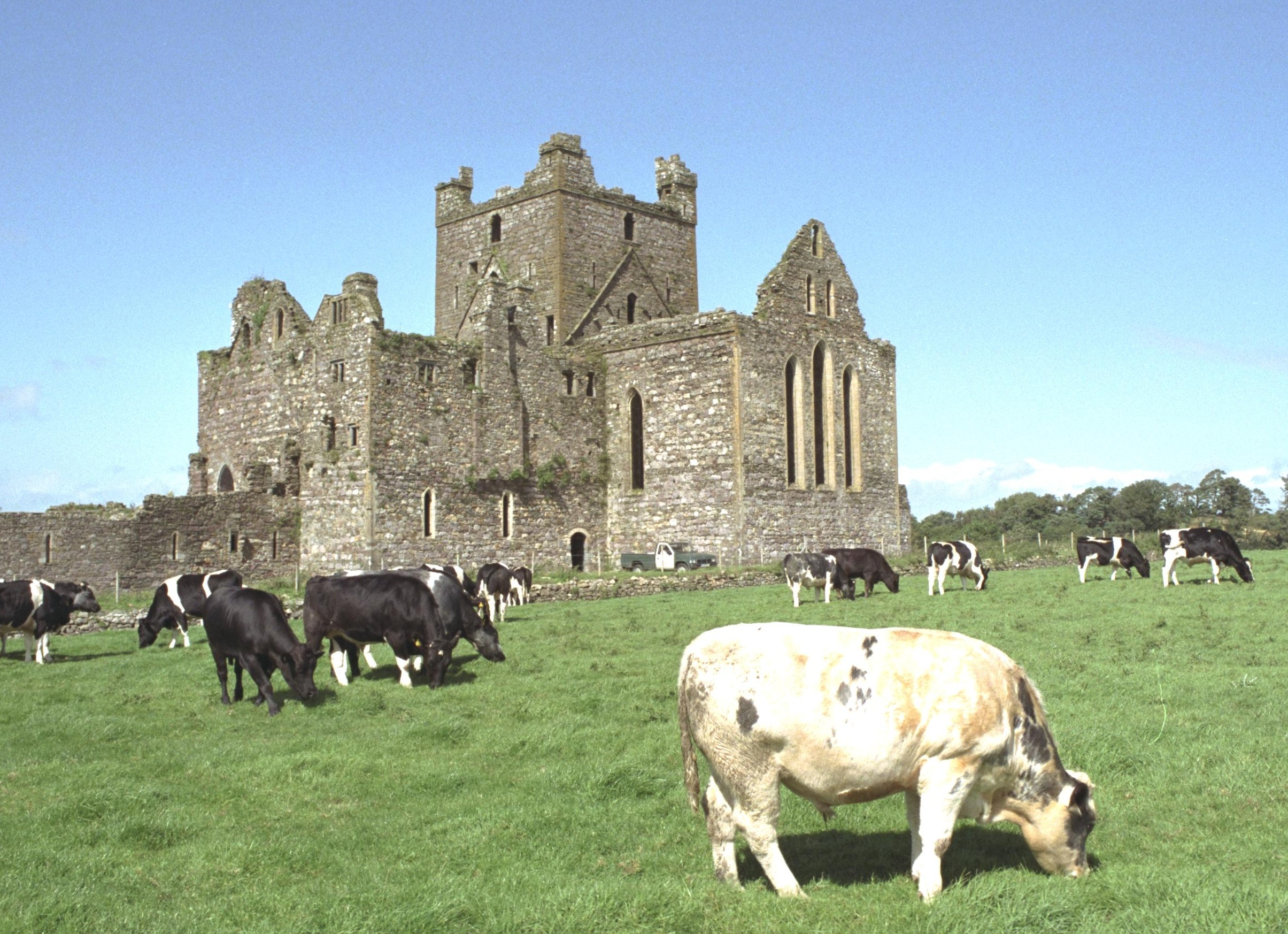
Dunbrody Abbey, in County Wexford.

In 1154 Pope Anastasius IV, at the request of Abbot Richard of Savigny, listed the Savigniac houses, now following the rule of the Cistercian brothers but subject to the abbot of Savigny. Each house is named, along with any other houses subject to it. Bildwas cum pertinentiis suis (with its appurtenances) appears alone, without any dependent monasteries. However, in December 1156 Abbot Richard and his convent of Savigny, addressing Abbot Ranulf of Buildwas, declared: commitimus atque concedimus vobis et domui vestre curam et dispositionem domus nostre Sancte Marie Dubline imperpetuum habendam. ("We commit and submit to you and your house the care and disposition of our house of St Mary, Dublin, to be held in perpetuity.") In 1157, Basingwerk Abbey in Flintshire was handed over to Ranulf and Buildwas Abbey on the same terms as the Irish house. Both Basingwerk and St. Mary's Abbey, Dublin, had formerly belonged to Combermere Abbey in Cheshire. An attempt in 1177 to reverse this change of dependence failed and prompted Savigny to send a collection of pertinent documents and a covering note to the abbot of Cîteaux, the head of the Cistercian order.

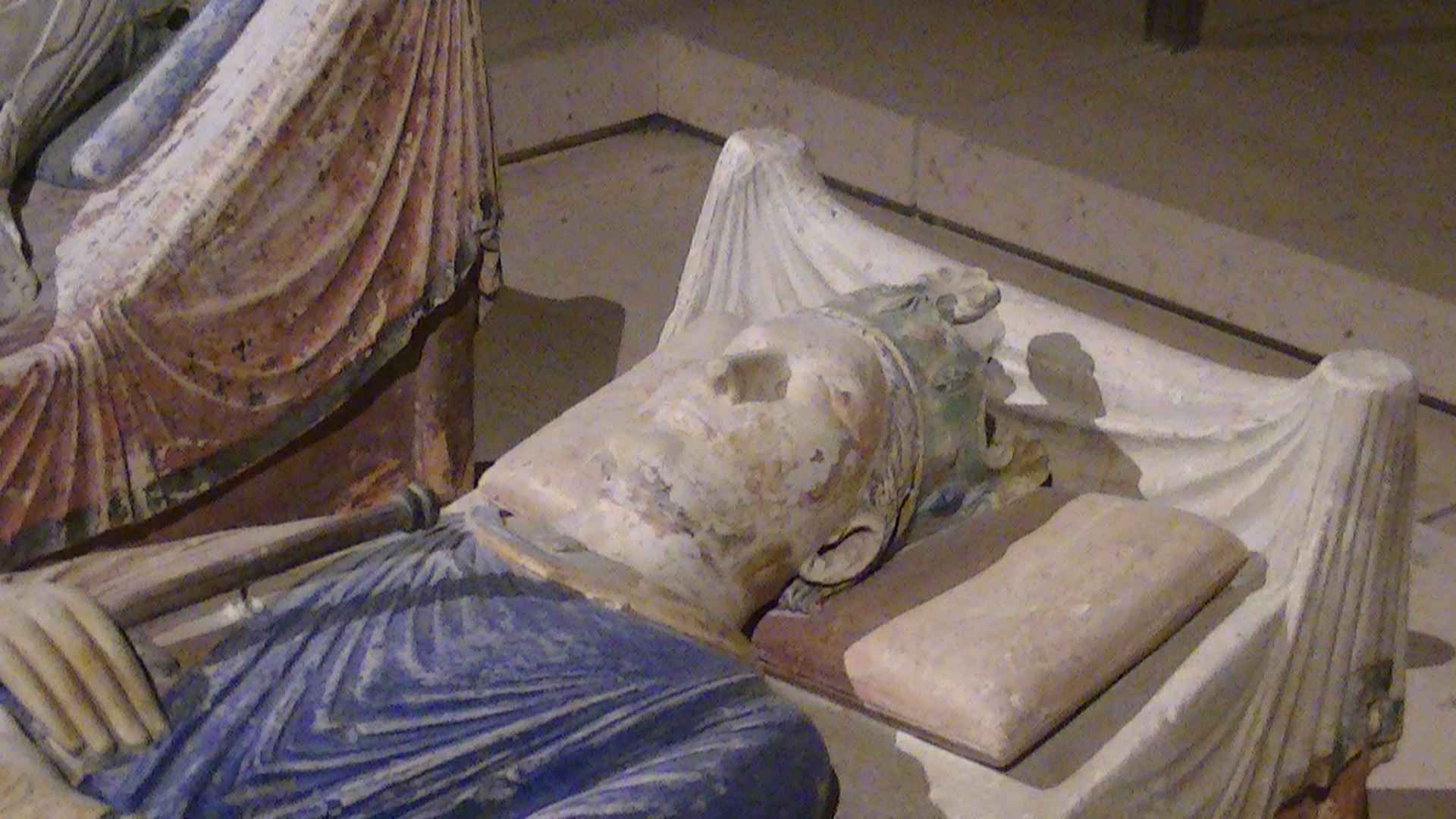
Detail from Henry II's effigy in the church of Fontevraud Abbey, Chinon.

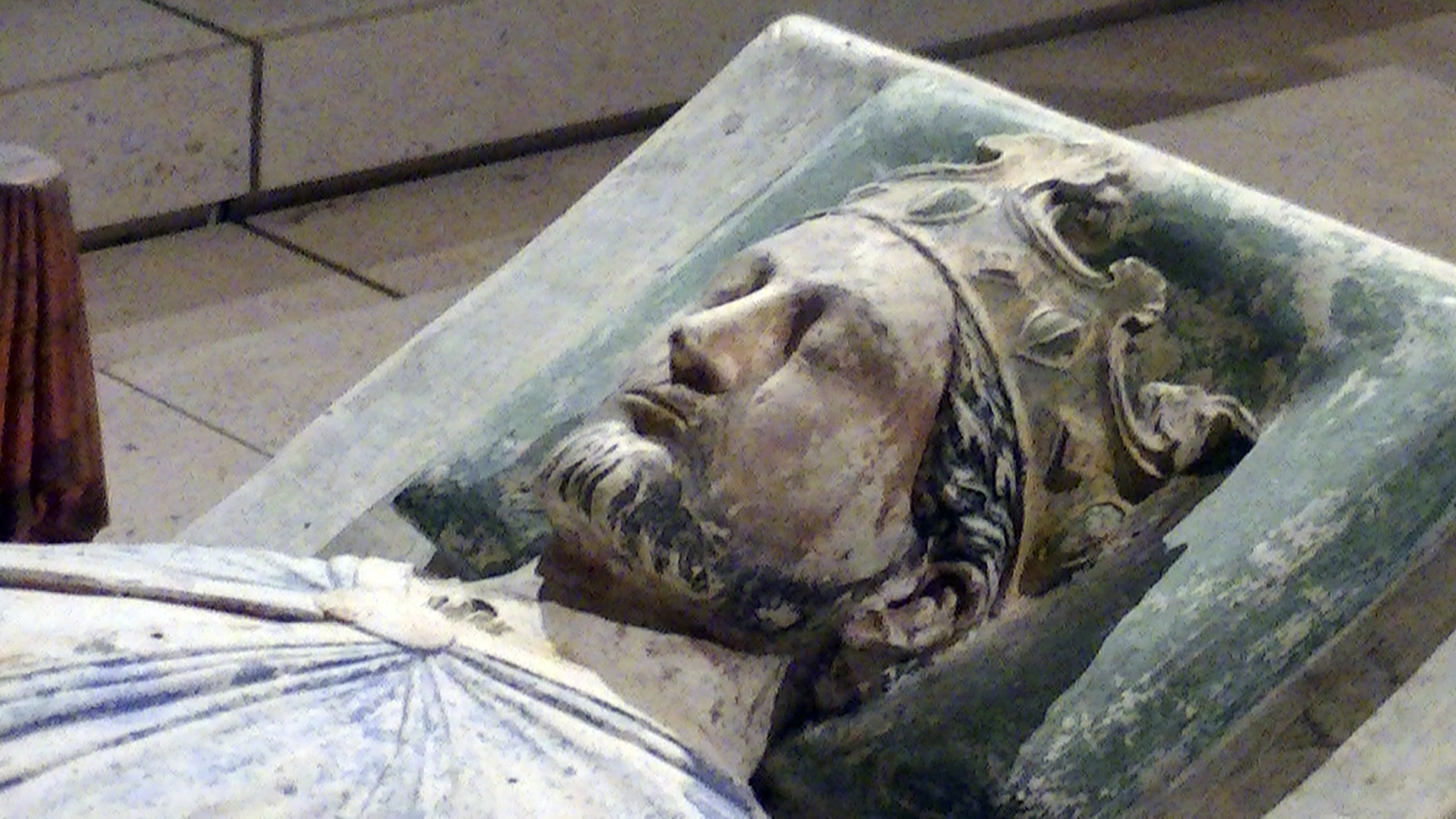
Effigy of Richard I at Fontevraud Abbey.

Bishop Richard Peche probably granted the house at Chester Foregate to Buildwas so that Abbot Ranulf could more easily discharge his responsibilities in Ireland. In 1183–4 Gilbert Pipard, the guardian of Chester, filed a claim for expenses of four shillings for arranging the passage of the abbot of Buildwas to Ireland, making clear that Ranulf did sail to Dublin from Chester, easily reached via Watling Street, which ran just north of the abbey. Pipard's claim was made on the basis that Ranulf was travelling in the king's service, and he seems to have been at least as much involved in Henry II's intervention in Ireland as in the affairs of the daughter house in Dublin. Gerald of Wales, in his account of the Synod of Cashel of 1172, portrays Ranulf as being central to the king's conquest of Ireland, helping to enact and dramatise his power by imposing his norms on the Irish church. The leading bishops of Ireland, he reports, attended the synod,

cum suffraganeis suis et coepiscopis, abbatibus quoque, archidiaconis, prioribus, et decanis, et multis aliis Hiberniensis ecclesiae praelatis, ex ipsius triumphatoris mandato, in civitate Cassilia convenerunt; et de utilitate ecclesiae, et statu eius in meliorem formam perducendo, ibidem concilium celebrarunt. Huic concilio interfuerunt isti, a rege missi: venerabilis vir Radulfus abbas de Buildewas, Radulfus archidiaconus de Landaf, Nicolaus capellanus, et alii clerici et nuncii domini regis. Concilii autem statuta subscripta sunt, et regiae sublimitatis authoritate firmata.

—
Translation:

with their suffragans and fellow-bishops, together with the abbots, archdeacons, priors, and deans, and many other Irish prelates, assembled by the conqueror's own command at the city of Cashel, and there held a synod concerning the well-being of the Church and the reformation thereof. At this synod were present, on the king's behalf, the venerable Ralph, abbot of Buildewas, Ralph, archdeacon of Llandaff, Nicholas the chaplain, and other clerks and messengers of our lord the king. The decrees of the synod were subscribed by the prelates, and confirmed by royal authority.

—

After Ranulf's assistance in Ireland, Henry II confirmed the transfer of St Mary's Abbey in Dublin to Buildwas in 1174, listing its numerous endowments that had been granted to it before Richard de Strigoil came to Ireland. Richard de Striguil, otherwise Richard de Clare, 2nd Earl of Pembroke, and later called Strongbow, was a potential threat to royal power, a Norman baron already powerful and well established in Ireland. His uncle, Harvey de Montmorency, was involved in negotiations with Ranulf to grant lands for the founding of a new Cistercian abbey at Dunbrody, which would be a daughter house of Buildwas Abbey and colonised by it. Ranulf sent a lay brother from Buildwas to survey the site, but the report was unfavourable. Ranulf ultimately decided to back out of the project, finally conceding to St Mary's, Dublin, the rights to the patronage and visitation of Dunbrody on 1 November 1182.

Ranulf seems to have travelled a great deal, and the chronicler of Waverley Abbey tells us that in 1187 obiit Rannulfus abbas de Bildewas in itinere capituli ("Ranulf, abbot of Buildwas, died on his way to the chapter"), i.e. the general meeting of the Cistercian order at the mother house in Burgundy.

== Wealth and endowments ==
Buildwas Abbey shared in the increasing prosperity of the 13th century and built up a large portfolio of estates that gave it a sound economic base, at least under normal conditions. As a result, it became part of a group of large Shropshire monasteries whose estates bore comparison with the great aristocratic families in the county. There were peak periods of acquisition in the 1240s and 1280s, as can be seen in the table below. The map based on the table demonstrates how Buildwas built up a concentrated belt of granges along the Rivers Severn and Worfe and the Shropshire-Staffordshire border, all quickly accessible from the abbey by routes that took full advantage of the River Severn itself. This was not an accident but a consequence of observing the Cistercian precept that granges should be within a day's journey of the abbey, a strategy for keeping the community relatively enclosed. However, the abbey also had fewer but larger estates, with extensive grazing, lands further away near the Welsh border and in distant Derbyshire.

Sketch map showing location of Buildwas Abbey in Severn valley and its nearest estates.

=== Strategies of expansion ===
Potentially the most valuable acquisition close to the abbey was the grant by Gilbert de Lacy, lord of Cressage, probably in 1232, of the vill of Harnage, near Cound, Shropshire. Despite initial difficulties, a combination of persistent legal defence and shrewd bargaining allowed the abbey to establish and consolidate its position in the area. The boundaries of the grant were meticulously detailed. As well as the land, the abbey was assigned rights of pasture for 50 cattle and for pigs, and right of road for the abbey's vehicles so that their employees could wash sheep and load barges in the River Severn. However, it seems Gilbert was in debt and in no position to make the grant. He had used the land as security for a loan from Ursell, son of Hamo of Hereford. It is unclear whether the abbey was expected to enter into a mortgage or purchase or whether Gilbert hoped to evade repaying Ursellus, who was Jewish. In 1234, shortly after Gilbert's death, the abbot secured from Henry III a complete cancellation of the pledge, although not presumably of the debt itself, and the Justiciars of the Exchequer of the Jews were notified of the change. By this time, however, the abbey was already involved in a complex suit with Gilbert's widow, Eva, who was claiming part of his estate as her dower. The abbey's position was guaranteed by a charter of the dead man's son, also called Gilbert, who swore to answer his mother's claim in court, should the need arise. However, the matter was settled by accord during 1236. By 1249 the younger Gilbert was dead and his son Adam in the wardship of Matilda de Lacy. The debts were still large and the king ordered that they should not be paid until after Adam came of age. With the pressure of a dower to be found for Agnes, Gilbert's widow and Adam's mother, the estate was still in trouble and in 1253 the abbot of Buildwas took the opportunity to purchase a 19-year lease of part of Cressage for 200 marks. In 1255 the Hundred Roll records the abbey as holding one hide at Harnage. By 1291 the abbey held the whole of Harnage, assessed at four carucates.

The same strategy was followed elsewhere: assiduous acquisition of lands and strengthening of authority and control in centres where the abbey already had lands, coupled with new inroads into centres close to existing granges. At Leighton, for example, the abbey began before 1263 with a mill and fishpond on the brook at Merehay. Next came the church, where in 1282 it first acquired the advowson or patronage, i.e. the right to nominate the parish priest, and then appropriated the church, thus acquiring the tithes. Very soon, the lord of the manor added land, including meadow. Sometimes Buildwas clashed with other important monasteries in the vicinity. Along the River Tern, Buildwas feuded with Lilleshall Abbey, which had numerous holdings. In 1251, for example, the abbot of Buildwas took out two writs, accusing his rivals of destroying his pool at Tern by tearing down the dam and of damaging his interests by unlawfully building a pool at Longdon. The Cistercian Croxden Abbey was much more accommodating. In 1287 it exchanged its grange at Adeney in Shropshire for Buildwas' Caldon Grange, an advantageous exchange for both abbeys, eliminating outlying granges to make administration easier. In line with a Cistercian prohibition, Buildwas did not set out to acquire either the advowsons or tithes of many churches: in 1535, shortly before dissolution, tithes were bringing in only £6 annually: £4 from Leighton and £2 from Hatton

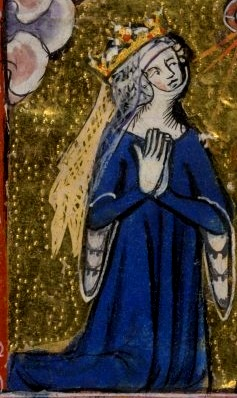
Eleanor of Woodstock

In 1292, under Edward I, close to the end of the major period of expansion, many individual grants to the abbey were confirmed by Inspeximus. Also under Edward I, the abbey's major privilege of immunity from secular dues and demands, was reiterated both by charter renewal and in quo warranto proceedings. However, this did not protect the abbey against some forms of royal begging letter, as when Edward III requested a subsidy for the marriage of his sister, Eleanor of Woodstock, to Reginald II, Count of Guelders in 1332.

=== Bridges and tolls ===
Some sources, including the Historic England listing page, claim that a significant part of the abbey's income came from bridge tolls An earlier Pastscape entry even implies that the community was small and that tolls levied on "passing travellers" its only source of income. The origin of this idea seems to be the earlier Department of the Environment (DoE) guide to the site, which proffers the very questionable information that "the properties of the abbey were never large" and couples it with the true but irrelevant statement that Buildwas was "classed among the smaller abbeys" at the dissolution. The Victoria County History volume on agriculture in Shropshire undercuts the premise by listing Buildwas Abbey among the great landowners of the county: its relative decline came in the late medieval period. The VCH article on Buildwas in the volume on religious houses, a detailed and fully referenced account, lists the main sources of income but makes no mention of tolls. It argues that the income of the abbey came mainly from stock rearing and points out that it was a major participant in the medieval wool trade, known as a source of raw wool at least as far afield as Italy.

The letters patent of Edward II do provide evidence that the abbots were occasionally authorised to levy tolls, but not as a regular source of income. On 17 March 1318 the king granted the abbey the right to levy a toll on goods passing over the bridge as pontage – a charge intended to finance the repair and maintenance of the bridge. This was to be for just three years, which suggests that no such charge was made ordinarily. It was specifically a levy on goods for sale, not on passing travellers or even on local people moving their own crops across the river. It was not to generate an income stream for the abbey itself but a way of contracting it to carry out public works, or rather works for the king. On 10 August that year the king appointed a commission of oyer and terminer to investigate an allegation that John, the abbot of Buildwas, and two of his monks, had carried away goods belonging to John Ludlow of Shrewsbury at Great Buildwas: possibly a dispute over the temporary tolls. In April 1325, Buildwas Abbey obtained a second grant of pontage for three years from Edward II. This time it did not relate to the Severn crossing but was to construct a bridge over "the water of Cospeford" – presumably the Humphreston Stream, a tributary of the River Worfe that now feeds Cosford Pool. This would have benefited the abbey by linking the estates at Ryton and Cosford to Donington and Ruckley more conveniently, as well as being useful to local traffic more generally. A further grant of pontage under Edward III in 1354, to repair the Severn bridge at Buildwas, does not specify means of raising the money.

The Severn crossing at Buildwas was important to Buildwas Abbey itself, a vital link between landed estates on either side of the river. It must also have been important to nearby Wenlock Priory: a litigious and sometimes violent community, but there is no record of disputes between it and Buildwas over tolls. Some time before the dissolution Buildwas established a guest house for travellers by the bridge on its demesne: the family running it in 1536 was surnamed Whitefolks, probably a reference to the white monastic garb of their employers. The most important Severn crossing in the area was at Atcham, and belonged not to Buildwas but to Lilleshall Abbey, which constructed a toll bridge in the early 13th century to carry Watling Street traffic over the river, replacing the earlier ferry. Lilleshall was allowed to levy a toll of 1 penny per cartload on goods traffic.

=== List of endowments ===
Location	Donor or original owner	Date of acquisition	Nature of property	Approximate coordinates
Buildwas manor	Bishop Roger de Clinton	1135	Land assessed as one hide at Domesday and subsequently.	52°38′07″N 2°31′38″W
Meole	Roger de Clinton and Hugh Nonant	1135–1192	A vill known as Crowmeole, uninhabited at Domesday, perhaps mainly pastoral. but apparently looked after by burgesses who lived in Shrewsbury. Bishop Hugh granted or confirmed the lordship of the manor in 1192.	52°42′11″N 2°47′21″W
Ruckley	Philip de Belmeis and Matilda, his wife.	By 1147	Land, with grazing and pannage further east and north in Tong manor.	52°39′24″N 2°19′38″W
Donington, Shropshire	Richard de Belmeis.	Early, possibly around 1150	Common pasturage throughout Donington manor and three acres of land to build a bridge to gain aceess from Ruckley.	52°39′21″N 2°19′15″W
Little Buildwas	William FitzAlan, Lord of Oswestry	Before 1160. Possibly 1140s.	The vill and "all that pertains to it on land, in the waters, woods, meadows and pastures."	52°38′23″N 2°32′01″W
Chester Foregate	Bishop Richard Peche	c.1161	A messuage or house	53°11′29″N 2°53′10″W
Between Weston and Brockton, Staffordshire	William, son of John Bagoth	1176	Land	52°42′49″N 2°17′55″W
Brockton	Gerald of Brockton and his son	Before 1189	Land	52°43′14″N 2°17′39″W
Cosford, Shropshire	Richard of Pitchford	Before 1189	The services of Richard Crasset. Later William Crasset exchanged the services and/or some parcel of land elsewhere for land at Cosford.	52°38′13″N 2°19′09″W
Hatton, Shropshire	Adam Treynel, also known as Adam of Hatton, and Reginald, his son.	Before 1189	A moiety of the vill of Hatton, situated to the east of the Twybrook, a tributary of the River Worfe.	52°38′10″N 2°20′56″W
Walton, Staffordshire	Walter Fitz Herman	By 1189	A moiety of the vill	52°45′22″N 2°17′09″W
Cauldon, Staffordshire	William of Cauldon	By 1189. In 1287 exchanged with Croxden Abbey for Adeney.	Land	53°02′07″N 1°52′22″W
Ivonbrook, near Grangemill in Derbyshire	Henry Fitz Fulk	By 1189	Land	53°07′27″N 1°38′24″W
Wentnor, Shropshire	Robert Corbet of Caus	About 1198	Mill	52°31′48″N 2°55′00″W
Hatton, Shropshire	John de Hemes and Walter, his son.	By 1202	John granted lease of a virgate and twelve acres of his demesne. Walter added the remainder of the land in the western moiety of Hatton, as far as the road that runs through Evelith. Annual rent of 12d. payable, with a further rent of five shillings to the Traynels, as manorial lords.	52°38′04″N 2°21′40″W
Wentnor	Robert Corbet of Caus	About 1203–1218	"Ritton" and "Hulemore": large areas of grazing land in the Stiperstones.	52°34′56″N 2°55′47″W
Kinnerton	Richard Corbet of Wattlesborough	Between 1217 and 1224	The entire vill of Kinnerton in Wentnor.	52°33′42″N 2°55′11″W
Broseley	Philip de Burwardesley	c. 1220	Right to quarry stone in the wood at Broseley and to cut down trees to make a road to the River Severn, but not to remove the timber.	52°37′22″N 2°28′46″W
Harnage, near Cound, Shropshire	Gilbert de Lacy, Lord of Cressage	By 1234, probably 1232	The whole vill, together with rights of pasture. Right of road through Cressage for the abbey's employees to wash sheep in the River Severn and to load barges there.	52°36′58″N 2°38′23″W
Kinnerton	Thomas Corbet of Caus	1236	Right to enclose the abbey's lands around Kinnerton.	52°33′49″N 2°56′16″W
Hope Bowdler	William, son of William de Chelmick	About 1240	Half a virgate of land.	52°31′36″N 2°46′23″W
Ragdon in Hope Bowdler	Robert de Acton, clerk	Between 1245 and 1255.	Land assessed as one hide, the whole of Robert's holding in Ragdon.	52°31′08″N 2°47′59″W
Upton	Alan la Zouche, lord of Tong	1247	The whole of Alan's vill at Upton in exchange for wider pasturage rights in Tong manor. The abbey then leased Upton to Walter de Dunstanville, the lord of Idshall	52°39′23″N 2°21′19″W
Bicton	William of Bicton	1247	2½ virgates of land with the site of a grange and an access road to the highway.	52°43′39″N 2°50′00″W
Stirchley, Shropshire	Osbert Fitz William, lord of Stirchley	1247 or shortly after.	All Osbert's interests in Stirchley, including manor house, garden, land and the homages of his tenants. Some of the land fell within a royal forest and the abbey obtained a licence to assart 60 acres of it in 1277.	52°39′37″N 2°26′36″W
Hatton, Shropshire	Robert Traynel	About 1248	The eastern moiety of Hatton in frankalmoin, replacing the previous lease arrangement, and effectively conceding to the abbey lordship of the manor of Hatton.	52°38′01″N 2°21′07″W
Benthall, Shropshire	Philip of Benthall	About 1250	Land called Hermiteshelde and Holweruding, with right of road to collect stone, coal and timber from Philip's land, and confirmation of right to construct a boundary ditch between his land and the abbey's.	52°37′43″N 2°29′56″W
Tern	Unknown	By 1251.	Land initially along the River Tern, where Buildwas disputed rights with Lilleshall Abbey. The value of the estates rose rapidly in the late 13th century, perhaps because several small properties came together, and were all leased to Lilleshall.	52°44′48″N 2°33′36″W
Cressage	Matilda de Lacy and Geoffrey de Genevill	1253	A 19-year lease on part of the manor for 200 marks.	52°38′00″N 2°36′18″W
Leighton, Shropshire	Robert de Wodecote	By 1263, as William de Leighton, lord of Leighton mentioned in the charter died that year.	A fish pond and mill at Merehaye in frankalmoin, but with a rent of 6 shillings to William de Leighton for aid and timber for repairs from his woods at Leighton. Right to build a further dam and mill on the same brook, with an annual rent of one pound of cumin to Sir William and his heirs, once constructed.	52°39′01″N 2°34′25″W
Blymhill	Henry del Park and his wife, Margery	1272	18 acres of pasture and one of meadow.	52°42′20″N 2°16′40″W
Leighton	Richard de Leighton to Robert Burnell, Lord Chancellor and Bishop of Bath and Wells, who regranted it in frankalmoin to Buildwas Abbey.	1282. Royal confirmation 28 February 1286	Advowson of Leighton church and one acre of land. Licence to appropriate the church granted by Roger de Meyland, bishop of Coventry and Lichfield.	52°38′34″N 2°34′25″W
Albrighton, Shropshire	William, lord of Ryton	By 1284. Confirmed after inspeximus 1 January 1285.	Several patches of arable and meadow between Whiston and Ryton.	52°37′19″N 2°20′01″W
Ryton, Shropshire	Hugh de Weston and Thomas de Marham	Confirmed by William, lord of Ryton, between 1279 and 1284, with royal licence to allienate in Mortmain 1285.	From Hugh a mill. From Thomas a meadow.	52°37′19″N 2°21′24″W
Atchley, Shropshire	William, lord of Ryton	By 1286.	A piece of land between Ryton and Cosford. Right of pasture throughout most of Ryton for the abbey's animals in the granges of Cosford and Hatton.	52°37′54″N 2°20′02″W
Leighton	Richard de Leighton.	1283/4	Additional meadowland and rights to pasture.	52°38′34″N 2°34′25″W
Adeney, in Edgmond, Shropshire	Croxden Abbey	1287	Obtained from the Cistercian Abbey of Croxden, in north Staffordshire, in exchange for Caldon Grange.	52°45′49″N 2°26′44″W
Bicton	Geoffrey Randulf of Newport	1288-91	Initially, the main house of the vill of Bicton and half the lordship of the vill. Later two more houses and 60 acres of land	52°43′49″N 2°49′15″W
Bonsall, Derbyshire	Edmund, 1st Earl of Lancaster	1296	Grazing for 400 sheep on the moor at a rent of 6s. 8d.	53°07′31″N 1°35′06″W
Little Buildwas	Edmund de Lenham and Alice, his wife.	1302	Lordship of the manor.	52°38′23″N 2°32′01″W

=== Generating income ===
Much of the land acquired by Buildwas Abbey was used for stock rearing. The Taxatio Ecclesiastica of 1291 showed about 60% of the temporalities in Shropshire and Staffordshire coming from stock and about 20% from the arable land of the abbey's demesne. Excluded from this are the Derbyshire lands, which included grazing for a large flock of 400 sheep, rented to the abbey by Edward I's brother, Edmund Crouchback for just 6s. 8d. Sheep seem to have been the main concern also in the Shropshire lands, with the rights acquired at Cressage allowing the abbey to wash sheep in the Severn and then ship them down river. The abbey was certainly involved in the European wool trade to an important extent and this was typical of Cistercian houses, which were at the forefront in supplying the growing Flemish markets. In 1265 the abbot of Buildwas was one of a number of monastic heads to whom Henry III wrote to regulate their business with wool merchants from the County of Flanders. In the first half of the 14th century Francesco Balducci Pegolotti stated the wool output of Buildwas ("Bihguassi") in his famous guide for Italian merchants, known as Pratica della mercatura as 20 sacks annually. He valued its wool at 20 marks a sack for the best, 12 marks for medium, and 10 marks for broken wool.

Although the 13th and early 14th centuries were the great age of demesne farming, Buildwas always acquired some income from rents and leases, generally inherited from the donors, as Cistercians were initially prohibited from renting to secular tenants. However, its income from churches was exceptionally low, less than 5% of net income in 1535, compared with over 80% at the Augustinian Chirbury Priory, for example.

== Abbots and Monks ==
=== Origins ===
All the known names of monks show English origins. Surnames like Boningale, Ashbourne and Bridgnorth suggest most were from Shropshire or the vicinity of the abbey's granges. Some were from landed gentry families: Abbot Henry Burnell, for example, who ruled the abbey around 1300, was brother of Philip Burnell, lord of Benthall. He gave his younger brother Hamo a paid post at the abbey and Hamo sold it back to a later abbot, John, illustrating the dangers of nepotism where local landed interests prevailed.

=== Spiritual and intellectual life ===
When Edward III proposed drafting in the abbot of Buildwas to reassert authority over the Welsh Cistercian abbey of Strata Marcella in 1328, he commented that at Buildwas "wholesome observance and regular institution flourishes." However, this was influenced by the king's own political interests in the Welsh Marches, and it is clear that he was determined to use the abbot of Buildwas as his agent. A later letter admits that the real problem at Strata Marcella was political: "unlawful assemblies to excite contentions and hatred between the English and the Welsh," so the king had reason to trumpet the effectiveness of the English abbot he hoped to use against a Welsh monastery.

Evaluation of the monastic life at Buildwas was the responsibility of the Cistercian order itself, as Cistercian monasteries were beyond the canonical visitations of the local bishop. Only one visitation on behalf of the mother house of Savigny has left a written record. In 1231 Stephen of Lexington issued statutes after a visitation, but those received by Buildwas were identical to those for Byland, Combermere, and Quarr, suggesting that there were no special grounds for censure: routine concerns about excessive conversation and dietary luxury, with instructions for improving the discipline of novice monks and lay brothers.

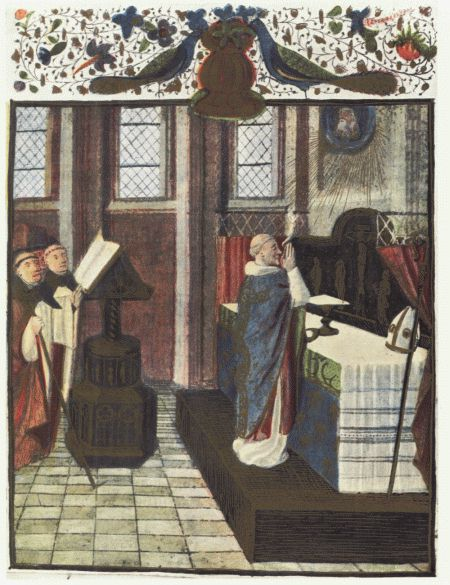
15th century high mass.

Monks generally pursued their education and spiritual development as far as the priesthood. There were plenty of opportunities to preside over the Eucharist at Buildwas, as there were at least eight altars Whenever the life of the abbey was disrupted, the main concern of kings and other interested parties was the interruption to chantry masses: celebrations of the Eucharist for the souls of the dead. These depended on the Catholic theology of the Sacrifice of the Mass and the belief that the "special fruit" made available through Christ's sacrifice was applicable at the will and intention of the priest. It was not only the great who expected to be remembered in the worship. When Henry del Park and Margery, who held just one twelfth of the manor of Blymhill between them, gave a right to common pasture to the abbey in 1272, the quid pro quo was that the abbot "will remember the same Henry and Margery, and the heirs of the same Margery, in all benedictions and prayers which henceforth shall be made in the aforesaid church forever." The kings repeatedly refer to the need for maintenance of chantries for their ancestors and for present future members of the royal family. This is reflected by the large number of altars, which make clear that the operation of chantries was the main business of the church at Buildwas, at least in the eyes of outsiders.

Cistercians were supposed to exercise their priestly office only within their own abbeys, with vicars appointed to appropriated churches. In 1307, however, Buildwas appointed a deacon, Robert de Munsterton, as vicar at Leighton parish church, which presumably necessitated sending a monk to celebrate Mass. In 1394, it simply sent one of its own monks, William de Weston, to act as chaplain. In 1398 Weston, now recorded as a monk of Buildwas and vicar of Leighton, received a licence to go on pilgrimage to Rome for the good of his own soul: what arrangements were made for the continuing cure of souls in his parish is unclear.

The tradition of book production and book ownership, probably begun by Abbot Ranulf, continued. In the library of Balliol College, Oxford, are a group of four 13th-century volumes from Buildwas, including works of St Bernard and St Jerome, as well as two anonymous works, that have similar decorative features, thought to indicate an origin in the same scriptorium, probably that of Buildwas Abbey itself. Another of Balliol's volumes is a glossed psalter bearing the inscription:

Liber sancte marie de Buldewas quem magister Walterus de Brug' dictus le Paumer legauit eidem domui Anno domini mo cco lxxo vijo tempore fratris Willelmi Tyrry tunc abbatis loci eiusdem

Translation:

A book from St Mary's, Buildwas, which Master Walter Bridgnorth, known as Palmer, bequeathed to that house in 1277, in the time of William Tyrry, then abbot of that place.

It has eleven fine initials and contrasts sharply in quality with the St Bernard volume, which the monks had produced for use in-house. but details suggest it was possibly a Buildwas product. It seems likely that Walter had commissioned this book from the abbey for his own use in his lifetime and then left it to the monastic library. The Palmers of Bridgnorth may have been a family who chose to invest their wealth in their own souls’ welfare by donating substantially to the abbey: in 1296 Abbot William is recorded as selling a house in the town's High Street for six marks to devote to pious purposes, which he was empowered to do as executor of Alan le Palmer. Anselm of Canterbury;

The library was founded on Biblical works and the Church Fathers. In addition to the Cistercian St Bernard's sermons, the library contained a number of other works by authors that at time were modern, like: Aelred of Rievaulx, another Cistercian abbot, Hugh of Fouilloy and Peter Cellensis. There was a full copy of the Historia rerum anglicarum of William of Newburgh, which has a note referring to a dispute between Savigny and Buildwas over St Mary's Dublin. There is very little secular learning and even the Latin Classics are represented only by a few letters of Seneca the Younger and grammatical work by Priscian and Boethius. Buildwas manuscripts were finding their way to the Oxford book market by the 15th century: this may reflect a decline in spiritual and intellectual standards at the abbey as a result of the disasters of the 14th century.

=== Abbots and their responsibilities ===
Although Edward I's assessment of monastic life at Buildwas was self-interested, the Strata Marcella affair suggests the importance of the abbots of Buildwas in both political and ecclesiastical matters. As well as regular involvement in the abbey's own Welsh and Irish daughter houses, abbots frequently travelled on Cistercian business as varied as attending the general chapter, inspecting the sites of proposed new abbeys and adjudicating disputes within the order. When Edmund de Lenham and his wife Alice transferred the lordship of Little Buildwas to the abbey in 1302, they confirmed the terms of the serjeanty under which they continued to hold the land from the abbey: most importantly their obligation to escort the abbot "anywhere within the four seas," potentially an onerous responsibility, although the costs were to be borne by the abbot. Stephen of Lexington enlisted the abbot of Buildwas in his efforts to reform the Irish Cistercian houses from 1228 and proposed to turn over Kilbeggan Abbey, a small Irish house, to Buildwas. There are numerous examples in the patent rolls of abbots being granted royal protection for overseas travel: for example, on 6 August 1275, 26 June 1278, 15 August 1281, and 8 August 1286. Protections specifically for visits to Ireland were granted on 18 January 1262, and 24 April 1285,

The political importance of the abbots is made clear by the frequency with which they were summoned to the Parliament of England In the reign of Edward I abbots of Buildwas are known to have been summoned to the parliaments of November 1295, the so-called "Model Parliament," November 1296, March 1300, January 1301, July 1302, September/October 1302, February 1305,

== Difficulties and responses ==
Up to the 14th century the abbey seems to have been well-governed and prosperous, surmounting the potentially serious problems of the Second Barons' War. However, economic, demographic and political factors converged to bring a series of crises in the mid-14th century that threatened its very existence. The abbey found adaptations that allowed it to survive these challenges, although at a reduced level of income and activity.

=== Extortion of 1264–5 ===
During the baronial revolt against Henry III, presumably in 1264, Robert de Ferrers, 6th Earl of Derby approached Buildwas Abbey with an armed force and extorted 100 marks (£66 13s. 4d). This was part of campaign of extortion in the West Midlands that included robbing the Jews of Worcester of their valuable documents. Ferrers made himself particularly obnoxious to the royal family during the period of their captivity and was among those against whom the king and Prince Edward proceeded most strongly after the recovery of royal power, which would provoke him into further rebellion in 1266. Visiting Hereford, the king set about righting Ferrers' wrongs in the region and wrote to Thomas le Blund, the earl's steward, on 1 June 1265, demanding restitution of the 100 marks, which he claimed had been surrendered by abbot and convent of Buildwas only on threat of incendio domorum et depredacione bonorum suorum (burning of the building and plunder of their goods.) It seems that the abbey recovered from the attack but the incident illustrated how vulnerable it was in times of conflict.

=== Economic pressures ===
Economic and demographic problems began to affect England decades before the arrival of the Black Death, although Shropshire was partly insulated by its mainly pastoral economy. The agrarian crisis of 1315–1317 brought the desertion of holdings and falls in rents. Large livestock raising businesses, like Buildwas Abbey, were less affected than the more labour-intensive arable estates and even the Murrain which followed in 1319–21 destroyed herds of cattle, not the Cistercian flocks of sheep. A notable delay by Buildwas in paying papal income tax dates from January 1325 and may indicate that the abbey was already feeling the pinch. Eyton notes the extraordinary violence of tone with which Bishop Roger Northburgh assailed the abbot in his exasperation or desperation, with threats of excommunication if the required sum were not paid by 2 February. By the 1340s, falling population and sheep disease were a general problem and must have been pressing on the revenues even of Buildwas. Other large monasteries had begun to pull out of demesne farming by this time.

=== Crisis of 1342–8 ===
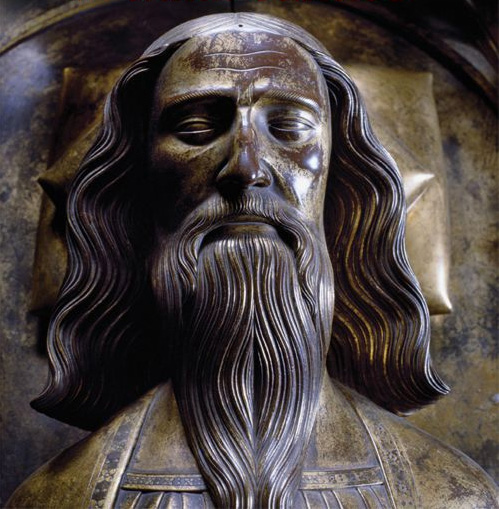
Edward III, as depicted by his effigy in Westminster Abbey.

The most sensational series episodes in the history of the abbey began with a typical overseas mission undertaken by an abbot. On 24 April 1342, Edward III granted protection for one year for the abbot, whose name is unknown, to make a visitation of Cistercian houses in Ireland. At this time the daughter house at Dublin was locked in a quarrel with Dunbrody Abbey, which had refused to accept its jurisdiction in 1340. By July 1342 the authority of Philip Wafre, the abbot of St Mary's Abbey, a Shropshire man, had been recognised by other Cistercian houses in Ireland. However, the abbot of Buildwas was murdered at about this time and on 16 September 1342 a royal commission was issued for the arrest of Thomas of Tonge, who had been indicted in Shropshire for the murder of his abbot and was now at large in secular clothing. The king ordered that he be detained in Shrewsbury jail. In view of the length of the protection afforded by the king to the abbot, it seems likely that the death had occurred in Ireland and that Thomas had left the scene. It is impossible now to ascertain Thomas of Tonge's rôle in or connection with the dispute in Ireland. He maintained his innocence throughout and there can be no certainty even that a murder was committed. In December 1443 Thomas succeeded in obtaining intervention by Pope Clement VI, who wrote to the abbot of Strata Marcella and to clergy at Lincoln Cathedral to activate the Cistercian procedures for accepting back apostate monks in favour of Thomas, "who was turned out of the monastery without reasonable cause, and desires to be reconciled to his order."

The situation at Buildwas now deteriorated rapidly, as the monks split into two distinct parties, each with its own candidate for the abbacy. This led to wastage: on 18 August 1344, the leader of one of the parties, Abbot Roger, acknowledged a debt of £100 to John Piard of Clun, with the abbey's own goods, including its church furnishings, as security. By 1 April 1346 the conflict had reached such a pitch that the king alleged it was scandalising and terrorising the neighbourhood of the abbey. The parties were issuing their own bonds, entering into loans, and selling leases on land, using the common seal of the abbey, as well as using up the supplies. Worse still, worship was disrupted and the chantry masses for the king and his ancestors were not being sung. The king commissioned two local worthies to intervene in the situation: Richard FitzAlan, 10th Earl of Arundel, Shropshire's greatest and richest landowner, and John Leyburne, one of the landed gentry. These two were to take control, with the advice of four monks considered reliable, and to divert the abbey's revenue stream to feed the residents and to relieve problems on the estates.

Evidently the internal dispute was resolved or suppressed. A protection granted on 13 April 1347 to Nicholas, the newly accepted abbot of Buildwas, makes clear that instead of supporting the Dublin daughter house, he was trying to assert direct control of Dunbrody, with royal support, although Abbot Ranulf had categorically renounced all rights over Dunbrody to St Mary's in 1182. Flying in the face of all the evidence, on 3 February 1348 a royal response to a parliamentary petition about Dunbrody dated its foundation to 1185 and credited it to the abbot of Buildwas, i.e. Ranulf, asserting that he had reserved to himself visitation rights. However, in July 1348 the king relented after a visit from the abbot of Dunbrody: the abbey was not dilapidated and any problems were the fault of the abbot of Buildwas and his agents. Evidently Buildwas successfully restated its case some time afterwards. A further travel protection from the king, issued on 7 November 1348, shows that the response in Ireland was expected to be violent. The king was again siding with Buildwas and making clear that Abbot Nicholas and his entourage were under special protection. The monks of both St Mary's and Dunbrody had organised themselves to offer armed resistance. Once again, the situation seemed to the king urgent because Dunbrody had fallen into disorder and was no longer offering masses for the souls of Henry II and his descendants, who included himself.

It seems that nothing came of the threats of violence and that St Mary's patiently assembled documentary evidence of Ranulf's renunciation of rights over Dunbrody, forcing Buildwas to withdraw its claims at the Cistercian general chapter of 1354. The conflict wound down to be replaced by a dire threat from another quarter.

=== Black Death ===
The Black Death arrived in Shropshire with devastating effect in the early Spring of 1349 and it was to return at intervals for almost three centuries. It seems that the early outbreaks of the plague roughly halved the Cistercian population of England, from well over 1600 to just over 800. At Buildwas the chapter was reduced to perhaps 6 in 1377 and 4 in 1381. The huge loss of population brought in its wake great economic pressure on landlords, including the abbeys. Holdings were left vacant and untilled. Agricultural prices and land values fell rapidly because of reduced demand. Labour, including the lay brothers on whom the Cistercians depended, was in short supply. While lay brothers had usually outnumbered monks in Cistercian abbeys in the first two centuries, a decline had set in even before the plague struck and it now became precipitous.

=== Abduction of 1350 ===
The worst of the plague was hardly over when Buildwas Abbey was attacked by a large raiding party from Powys in Central Wales. The abbot and his monks were taken away and imprisoned in Powys. As the king notes in his commission in response to the raid, the plunderers broke into the church and claustral buildings and rifled chests and storage places, taking away jewels, vestments, chalices and books from the abbey. The leading figure in the commission of oyer and terminer was William de Shareshull, a prominent judge in the king's service and a Staffordshire man. He was supported by Roger Hillary, another important justice, and a selection of Shropshire magnates.

Exactly what this powerful body achieved is not recorded but some of the steps taken by the abbey to promote recovery after the disaster have left a mark in the records. These seem to be the work of an abbot called Hugh, who was perhaps the successor to Nicholas. In May 1354 he secured pontage for three years to repair the bridge over the Severn at Buildwas. The following month he paid 20 shillings to the king for permission to make a deal with the powerful Arundel. This granted to Arundel in fee the manors of Kinnerton, Ryton and Stirchley in exchange for the church of Cound in Leighton. This looks like an attempt to get out of demesne farming but there is a gross disparity between the two sides in the exchange. Cound church never appears among the spiritualities of Buildwas so the exchange is most likely to be part of the complex web of legal fictions woven by Arundel to protect the dower and jointure properties of his wife, Eleanor of Lancaster. In dangerous times Hugh seems to have been building connections to the great noble families and their affinities to improve his abbey's position.

=== Retreat from the demesnes ===
The original statutes of the Cistercian order prohibited the leasing or renting of land to lay people and were only hesitantly relaxed in the 13th century. In 1302 Pope Boniface VIII showed his gratitude to the Cistercians for their support in his conflict with Philip IV of France by allowing them relief from tithes on a wide range of lands they leased. In 1315, a famine year, the general chapter of the order permitted lifetime leases where the location of properties made this convenient. It seems that most houses increasingly leased out their land, rather than cultivating it as part of their own demesne, as the 14th century passed, with the process accelerating after the Black Death and into the 15th century, although the process varied considerably from abbey to abbey.

Buildwas ultimately ceased demesne farming on all but the home grange, the land immediately surrounding the abbey site, and trading in leases was so brisk that they were sometimes sold years before the previous lease had expired. At Ivonbrook, for example, the lease changed hands and was sublet several times. Richard Foljambe quitclaimed the estate in 1366, perhaps because he was already the lessee and the abbey's lordship needed to be vindicated. In 1379 Ivonbrook Grange was leased to Oliver and Alice Barton for 24 years at an annual rent of 8 marks. By 1436 the Foljambe's were back in control, with Thomas Foljambe subletting Ivonbrook to Sir Richard Vernon, an arrangement that was renewed in 1441, with the rent still at 8 marks. The Valor Ecclesiasticus of 1535 and the Court of Augmentations accounts after the dissolution continually use the terms firma (farm) and redditus (rent) for the revenues of Buildwas: although flexible in use, both indicate some form of rental or leasing agreement. This change made the abbey increasingly dependent on the market economy. Food for example, often had to be bought, rather than home produced. Sometimes barter was employed to secure supplies: in 1521 the abbot was forced to obtain eight beef cattle and forty cheeses by assigning all the timber in a wood called Swallotaylle to Robert Hood of Acton Pigott. Ordinary paid labour replaced the lay brothers who had previously shouldered both manual and managerial tasks.

=== Further raids ===
Owain Glyndŵr's rebellion had a devastating impact on Shropshire. From the burning of Oswestry in 1400 the rebels progressed in 1403 to raiding the lowland areas of the county. Among the many appeals for help from the county, it seems that Buildwas was effective in winning a hearing. On 2 April 1406 Henry IV sold a licence for 20 marks for Hugh Burnell, 2nd Lord Burnell, to grant the advowson of Rushbury church to Buildwas Abbey. The occasion for this is given as the damage caused by Welsh rebels, who have burned a large part of the estates, to the detriment even of worship at the abbey. The licence also allowed the abbey to take over the tithes of the church, so long as provision was made for a vicar and for the poor of the parish. Burnell was potentially a valuable ally, a marcher lord, governor of important castles, influential in Shropshire and a trusted supporter of the House of Lancaster: unfortunately he died sine prole in 1420. The abbey had need of powerful allies later in the century, when the Leighton family bullied the monks, hoping to extort a payment for the property their ancestors had granted freely.

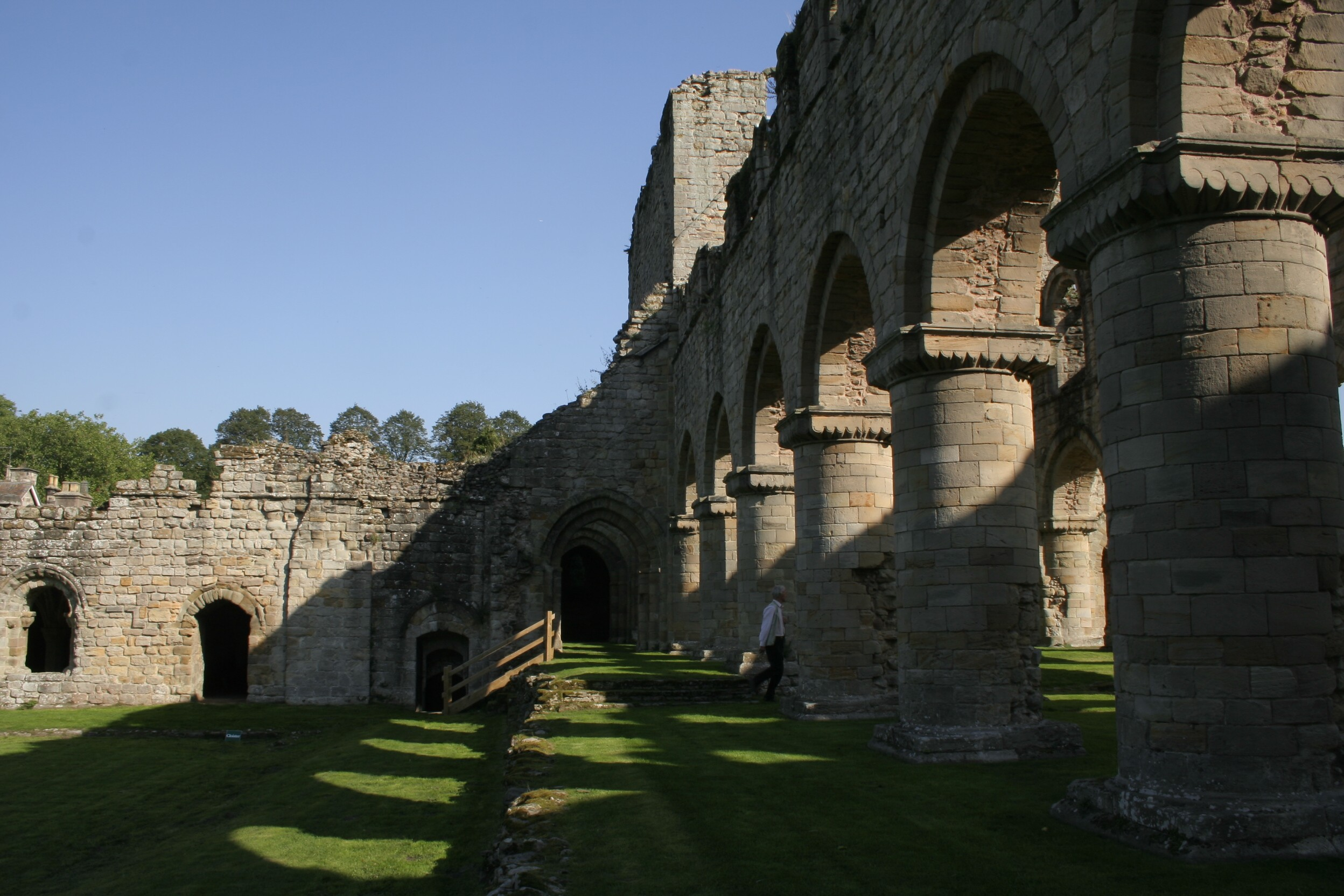

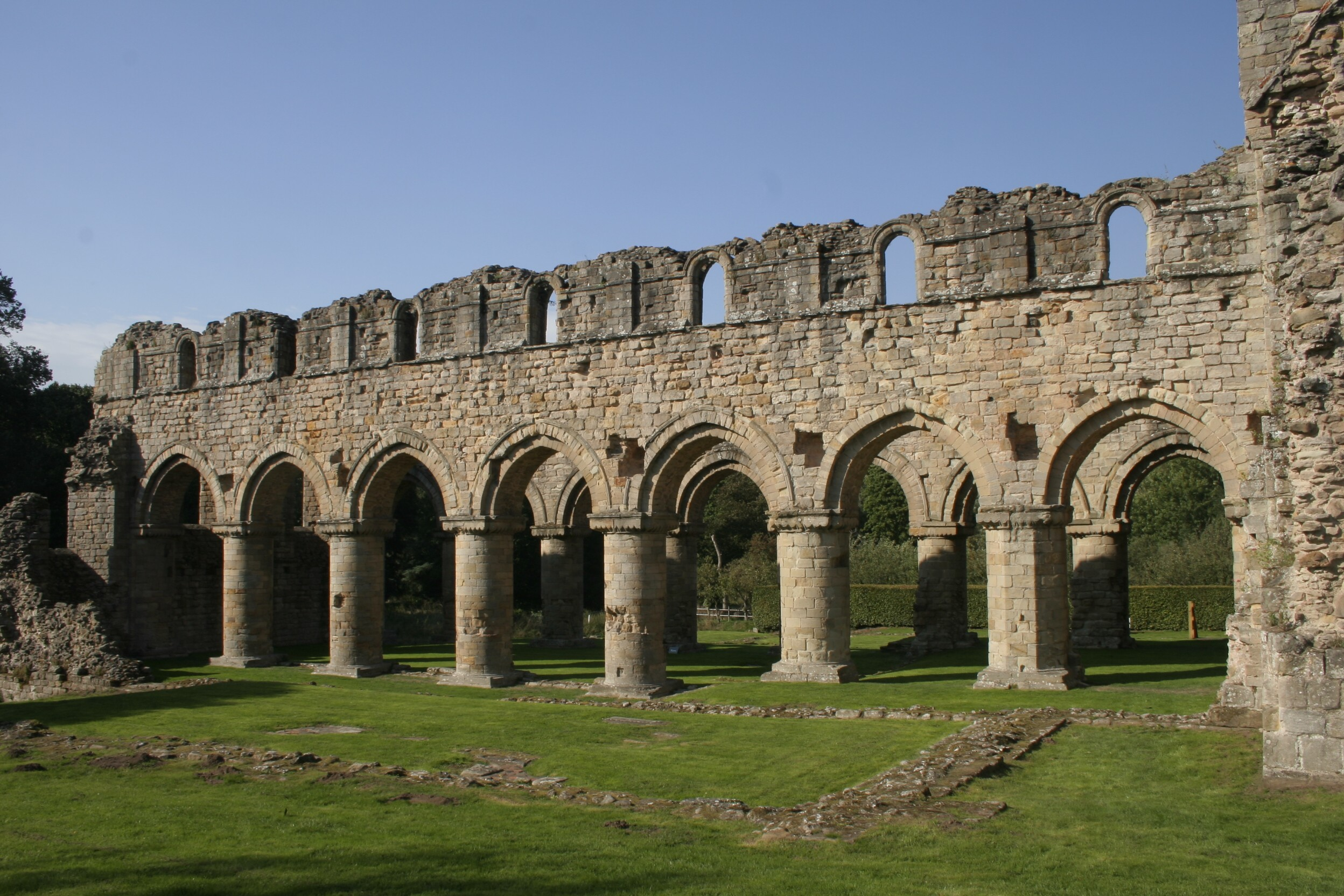

== Decline and dissolution ==
A visitation from the general chapter of the Cistercians in 1521 found Buildwas "very far from virtue in every way." The abbot, Richard Emery, was deposed, although he continued to live in the abbey on a corrody, effectively an annuity paid in kind. The evident souring of relations with local gentry and the low standards of monastic discipline heralded a major transformation of the Church and the countryside that came with the Dissolution of the Monasteries, achieved in stages between 1536 and 1540.

Valor Ecclesiasticus in 1535 found that the gross temporalities of the abbey amounted to £123 6s. 10d. and its spiritualities to £10. Buildwas itself brought in £20 9s. 8d. and the rest of the Shropshire estates, all leased or otherwise rented out, were worth £64 13s. 10d. In Staffordshire the Walton estate still brought in a useful £9 but the property at Lichfield was worth a mere 3s. 4d. In Derbyshire The vast grazing lands around Bonsall were no longer rented from the Duchy of Lancaster but Ivonbrook still brought in an income of £6. Set against this were allowable expenses amounting to £18 7s. 6½d. The bulk of this sum was made up of the stipends paid to the managers who collected and accounted for the abbey's rents. Chief of these was the seneschal or chief steward, George Talbot, 4th Earl of Shrewsbury, who was paid £2 13s. 4. by Buildwas, although he held no less than eleven such posts in monasteries. Under him were an auditor, Richard Salter; a court steward, Thomas Harnage; a receiver, Richard Uphold; and two bailiffs, Thomas Sandford (for the westerly properties of Kinnerton, Crowmeole, Bicton, and Shrewsbury) and Thomas Morgan (for Buildwas, Adeney, Stirchley and other estates further east). The net income was calculated to be £110 19s. 3½d. As Buildwas was well below the threshold of £200 net income, it was scheduled for dissolution in 1536, together with the rest of the lesser monasteries.

Thomas Cromwell's commissioners found twelve monks still living at the abbey in late 1535 and the moral standards of four of them were judged unsatisfactory. By April 1536 the number of monks was down to eight, all priests and considered to be "of good conversation," except the abbot. Other residents included 22 servants, three of them women, four people living on alms and three on corrodies, one of them the former abbot.

The Court of Augmentations carried out a further valuation prior to putting the abbey and its estates on the market. This was broadly similar to the previous valuation, with some adjustment downwards: Harnage remained at £13 6s 8d. and Cosford at £3, for example, while Hatton fell from £5 6s. 8d. to £3 6s. 8d. Some estates were broken down into smaller elements, presumably to aid evaluation.

== After dissolution ==
=== The Grey inheritance ===
In July 1537, Buildwas Abbey and all its estates were granted to Edward Grey, 3rd Baron Grey of Powis. His annual rent was set at £55 8s. 8d. An annual pension of £16 was to be paid to the last abbot, Stephen Green. Grey was not to be held responsible for this or the continuing corrodies which the abbey had taken on, including that of Richard Emery, the previous abbot. The final payments from the Exchequer to cover corrodies and annuities undertaken by Buildwas Abbey were not made until 1553. The payees were William Charlton, Stephen Pell, the previous incumbent of the parish church, and Edward Laken, all listed in both 1537 and 1553.

Lord Powis died at Buildwas and was buried at Pontesbury on 9 July 1551. Lord Powis had no legitimate issue but he did have a family by his long-term mistress Jane Orwell, daughter of Sir Lewis Orwell of Ashwell, Hertfordshire. In the year of Grey's death, Jane Orwell married John Herbert, whose family dominated the new county of Montgomeryshire from their seat at Montgomery Castle. Hence, John Herbert became established with her at Buildwas, which must have been adapted from the mid 16th century to provide the normal amenities of a substantial private house. The abbot's house and parts of the infirmary court were remodelled over time to become Abbey House, now a building distinct from the abbey ruin and listed separately by Historic England.

John Herbert had important court and political connections through his cousin William Herbert, 1st Earl of Pembroke, the husband of Anne Parr, Catherine Parr's sister, and a sometimes erratic Protestant soldier who just managed to stay out of trouble during Queen Mary's reign. On 15 January 1559, the coronation day of Elizabeth I, a general pardon was issued to "John Herbert of Byldwas, co. Salop, alias of Walshe Pole, co. Montgomery Grey's estates were the subject of protracted litigation after his death, although he had entailed the Buildwas estates, among others, by a deed of 31 March 1546, on the eldest of his illegitimate sons, also called Edward Grey, now John Herbert's stepson. On 6 March 1560 the Buildwas estates, listed at length, were committed by letters patent to "Edward Graye, bastard son of Edward Graye, knight, late lord Powes," by mainprise, i.e. financial guarantee, of John Herbert, other members of the Herbert family, and Sir Nicholas Bagnall, a wealthy Protestant soldier who had made a fortune in Ireland but fallen into disfavour under Mary.

Herbert was not noted for his commitment to or impact on his new county: he was Member of Parliament for the Shropshire constituency of Much Wenlock in 1553 but for New Romney in Kent two years later. Nor was he noted for his financial probity. In 1564 he was detained in the Fleet Prison for debt and was compelled to sue for a pardon of outlawry, which was issued on 9 June. He had been outlawed because of his failure to appear when summoned to the Court of Common Pleas over two debts. He owed £40 and 30 shillings damages to Michael and Robert Hare, acting as executors for their mother Catherine, who was herself executrix of her husband Nicholas Hare, former Master of the Rolls, who had been one of Queen Mary's most trusted servants. Herbert also owed £30 to Thomas Griffith, a London mercer. He was described as "late of London" in relation to the first debt and "late of Bildewas" in relation to the second. It seems he died about 1583.

Meanwhile, a scandal relating to the former Buildwas estates had been uncovered by one James Handley. Around the time of the dissolution, one of the lessees, Robert Moreton of Haughton near Shifnal, had granted by his will various tenancies to the churchwardens of Shifnal parish church to set up a chantry, including a dedicated priest, for himself and his family. The grant included the granges at Brockton and Stirchley, both formerly the property of Buildwas Abbey, as well as other property around Shifnal. The arrangement had somehow been concealed through the suppression of the chantries and colleges under Henry VIII and Edward VI. Grateful for Handley's persistence in uncovering the fraud, the Queen granted the leases of Brockton and Stirchley to him.

=== Later owners of the site ===
The younger Edward Grey resided at Buildwas and the estate passed to his son, a third Edward Grey, in 1597. This Edward Grey sold the Buildwas estate through a complicated and indirect process, involving a number of eminent lawyers. In 1609 he received licence to alienate Buildwas to Thomas Harries, serjeant-at-law, a prominent Lincoln's Inn lawyer of Shropshire origins. The property was then conveyed to Thomas Chamberlayne, a prominent lawyer and steward to the Lord Chancellor, Lord Ellesmere, by Sir Robert Vernon of Hodnet and John Curzon of Kedleston in 1612, with Grey and Harries confirming the transfer of title the same year. In 1617 Chamberlayne sold Buildwas to his employer, now Viscount Brackley, who died shortly afterwards.

Lord Brackley's son John Egerton inherited the estate and soon became Earl of Bridgewater. He sold Buildwas in 1649, the year of his death, to a fellow royalist, Sir William Acton, a prominent businessman and former Lord Mayor of London. Sir William himself survived only to March 1651. As he had no sons, he left a large inheritance for his daughter Elizabeth, who was married to Sir Thomas Whitmore, 1st Baronet, a prominent Shropshire royalist. However, some of his landed estates, including Buildwas, were left to a more distant Shropshire relative, William Acton, a younger son of Sir Edward Acton, 1st Baronet of Aldenham. William Acton married Mary Weaver of Morville and died as early as 1656. He left his estates to his daughter Jane, who married Walter Moseley of Mere Hall, near Lutley, in Enville, Staffordshire. The house at Buildwas Abbey, later known as Abbey House, became the Moseley family's dower house.

== The ruins ==
The remaining abbey buildings are now in the care of English Heritage. They are open to the public, who can view the church, which remains unaltered since its original construction. Although without a roof and much of the walls, the remains are considered to be among some of the best preserved 12th-century examples of a Cistercian church in Britain.

=== Arrested decay and artistic licence ===
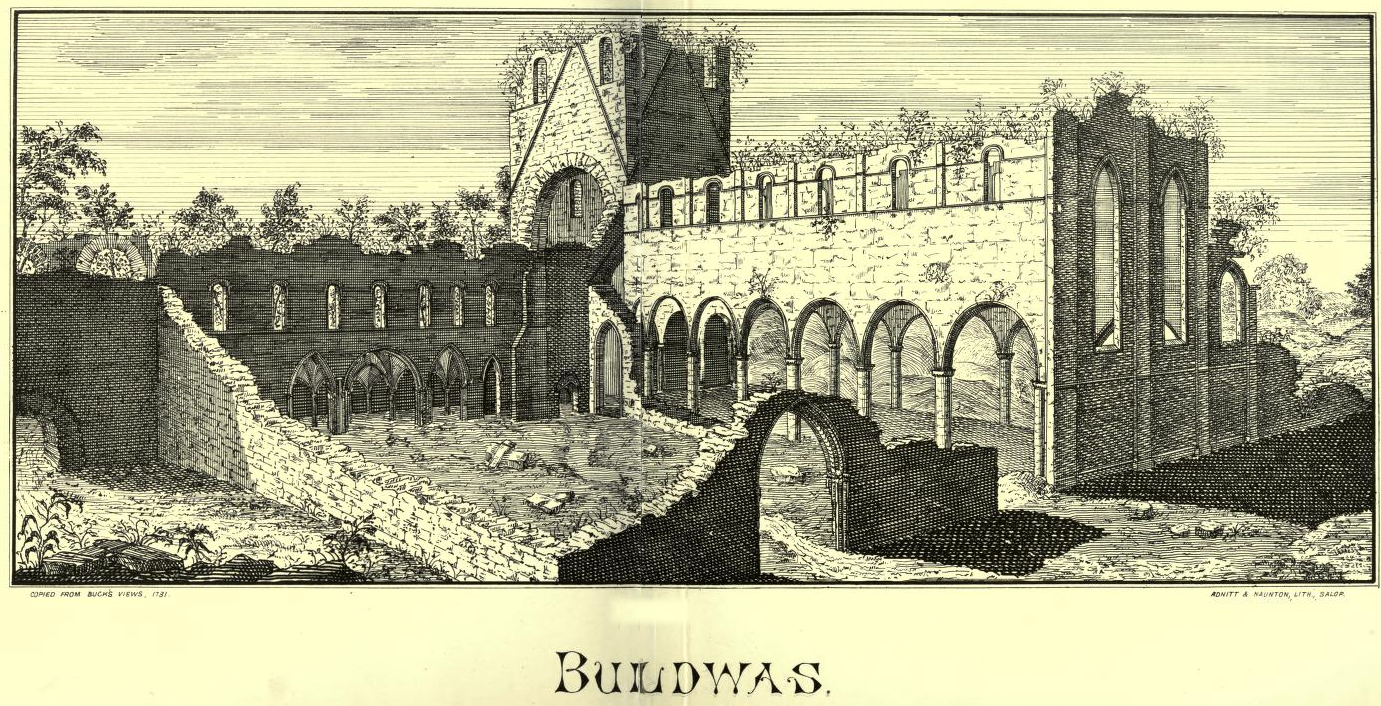
A view of the abbey copied from the Bucks' engraving, published in Walcott's The Four Minsters Round the Wrekin(1877)

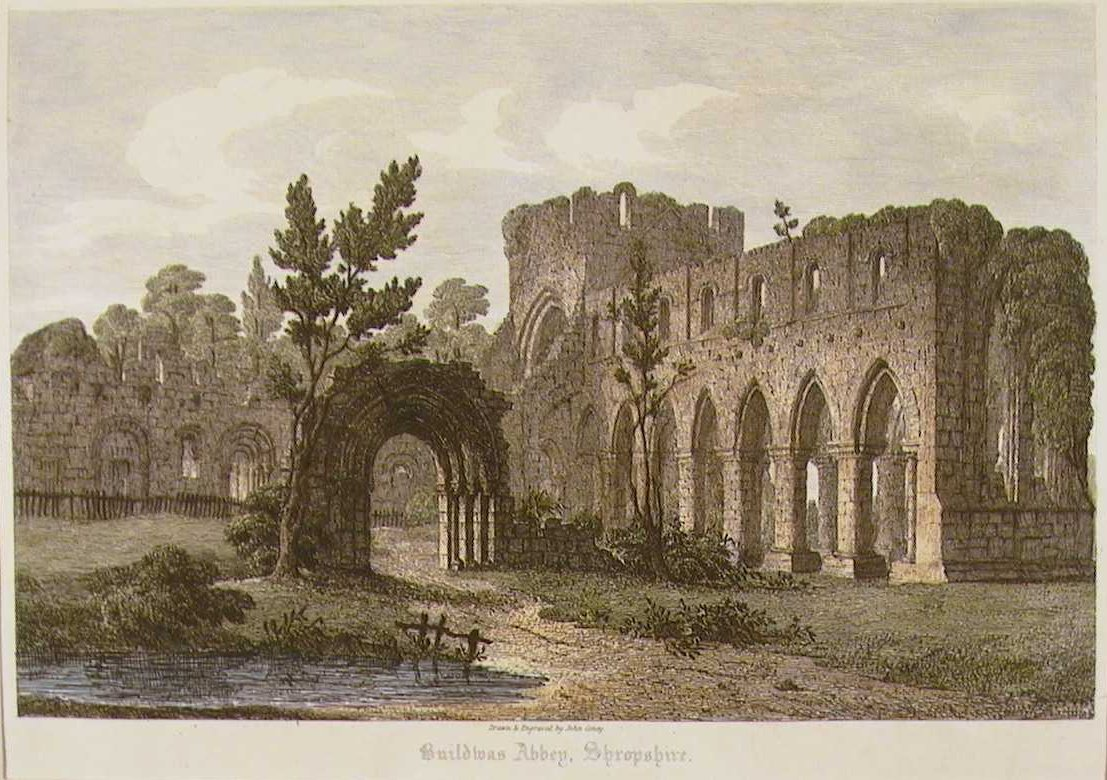
John Coney's engraving of 1825.

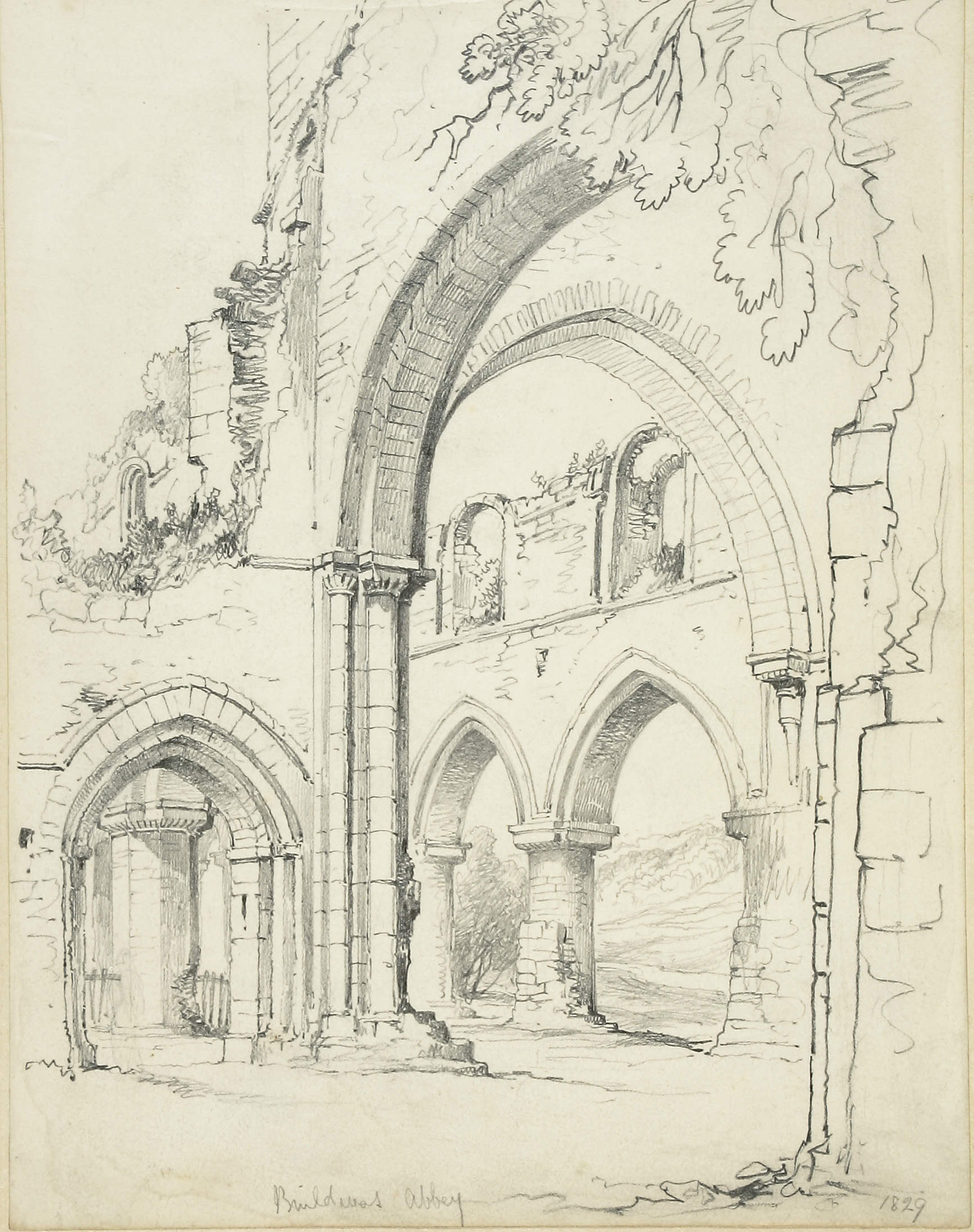
Buildwas Abbey, drawn from the south transept, looking diagonally through the crossing towards the nave, 1829. Attributed to Samuel Rostill Lines of Birmingham

There are indications that the abbey needed fairly frequent maintenance even when in use. In 1232, for example, Henry III at Bridgnorth was persuaded to donate thirty oak trees from the nearby royal forest of Shirlett to the abbot specifically ad reparationem ecclesie sue, "towards the repair of his church." The nave and aisles were roofed in wood. However the structure as a whole was in good repair up to the dissolution and the only major modification since the completion of the church and claustral buildings was a large chapel on the south side, constructed about 1400 and possibly for the lay servants who had largely replaced the lay brothers by that time.

The recyclable metals were always valued separately by the king's commissioners and the bells and lead at Buildwas were reckoned at over £94. Once stripped of the lead roof covering, rapid decay and collapse of the roof would have been inevitable. The decay over the first two centuries can be gauged from Samuel and Nathaniel Buck's 1731 engraving of the abbey, inexplicably entitled "the South-West View of Bildewas-Abby in the County of Salop," which was dedicated to Acton Moseley, the son of Jane Acton and Walter Moseley. The outer walls of the aisles had disappeared almost completely. Little remained of the cloisters, although the northern and western walls partially survived and the latter still had a complete doorway. There was also part of the east wall of the refectory. The engraving itself was evidence of an already changing attitude to ancient buildings, and Buildwas attracted a number of notable artists in the 18th century. Both Paul Sandby and Michael Angelo Rooker pictured the interior of the church in use as an agricultural store. J. M. W. Turner left at least two drawings and a watercolour of the abbey ruins.

More helpful as a witness to the condition of the church is a sketch from about 1800 by Edward Williams, incumbent of Battlefield Church, showing it much as in 1731, although its south west viewpoint shows that a small part of the south nave wall still stood. Other artists tended to bend the truth to their own preconceptions of a medieval ruin. Although a trained architect, John Coney could not resist sharpening the arches of the church, to conform to a preconception of the gothic, in his 1825 illustration for an important revision of William Dugdale's Monasticon, although the actual building has only very blunt points, characteristic of late Romanesque architecture. In 1839 Rev John Cox Bayliss, a railway engineer and draughtsman, presented the ruined church from the north west in an idyllic riverine scene that revealed the remaining cloister walls had gone, probably decades earlier. As Eyton noted in 1858:

Now at length the time has come when a changed state of feeling again views such Ruins as sacred;—sacred to departed genius and taste, sacred to the ever-living beauty of grandeur and repose, sacred indeed to yet higher and holier associations, of which nothing but a too narrow Sectarianism would forbid the indulgence.

For Mackenzie Walcott two decades later Eyton's exalted view of Buildwas had to be supplemented with the practical value of tourism:

These unrestored memorials of the infinite taste and genius of our forefathers, who built for eternity, are very precious as a school of instruction, and should be regarded as national monuments. ....The careful preservation of these remains from demolition and wanton injury, and the stoppage of the progress of further decay materially conduce to the attractions and interest of their neighbourhood, and the good name of those persons into whose hands their safe keeping has devolved.

Deterioration of the ruins seems to have been largely arrested by Eyton's time and Walcott's 1877 study included a plan little different from that in recent guides to the abbey. The claustral buildings to the north of the nave were now down to footings but the abbey church showed little change since the Bucks' engraving, which Walcott had copied. In 1915 the ruins were the subject of a protection order under the Ancient Monuments Consolidation and Amendment Act 1913. In 1925 Major H. R. Moseley placed the site in the care of the Commissioners His Majesty's Works, whence it passed to the Ministry of Works and its successors, at present English Heritage. Maintenance continues: in 2019, for example, the south wall of the presbytery was partially fenced off for repairs.

=== Description ===
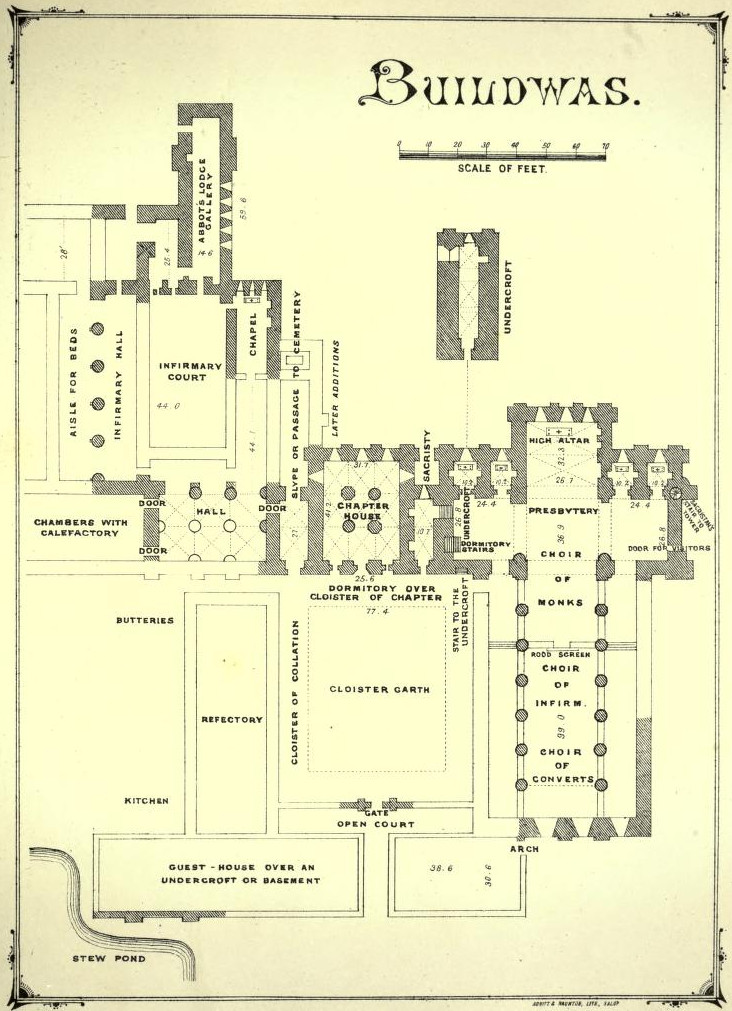
Plan of Buildwas Abbey, from Walcott's The Four Minsters Round the Wrekin, 1877.

The abbey site is a short distance south of the River Severn. The drainage opportunities afforded by the river made it sensible to place the claustral buildings to the north of the church, which is roughly parallel to the river, and so fairly accurately oriented. The remains of the buildings are entirely of local sandstone: all wooden parts disappeared long ago. The remains of buildings around the infirmary court and the abbot's lodging, all on the north and east sides of the site, are not open to the public, as they are within a private residence. The remains that are open to the public, free of charge at present, are described below.

==== The church ====
The abbey church is an originally cruciform structure, about 163 feet (50 m) in long and 26.7 feet (8.1 m) wide (not including the aisles), made up of

- a chancel or presbytery to the geographic and ecclesiastical east, about 34 feet (10 m) in length, which is aisleless, square ended, i.e. without an apse, and extends to two bays.
- a crossing, surmounted by a low, rectangular central tower.
- north and south transepts, or "arms" of the cross, each containing two chapels, and making the church about 84 feet (26 m) across at that point.
- a nave of seven bays with north and south aisles, the western five bays, running to a length of about 70 feet (21 m), originally divided from the eastern two bays, which, together with the crossing formed part of the monks' choir, totalling 62 feet (19 m) in length.
- a large, later chapel on the south side.

The roofs and all but a small section of the aisle walls are missing, as are the walls of the south chapel.

The arches of the nave are perhaps the most striking feature of the site, visible immediately to the visitor. The remains of low walls between the arches show that the aisles were divided from the nave to allow circulation during services. Walcott considered that the seven columns on each side represented the seven pillars of Wisdom from the Book of Proverbs (Proverbs 9:1), which is less than likely as there are actually only six. The columns are massive and round in section, except the eastern pair: the south of these is octagonal while the north is semicircular on the inside and semi-octagonal on the outside. All rest directly on square plinths. They are austere, with the capitals simply scalloped and claw ornamentation on some of the bases. The arches are bluntly pointed. Above them rises a tall clerestory, although there was never a triforium or raised gallery on the inside of the nave. The windows of the clerestory have semi-circular heads and most still have shafts at each side with delicately decorated capitals. There are two windows in the western end of the nave, very high up but with no west entrance beneath them: the drop in ground level to the west was very sharp. Internally too there is a drop in floor level at the western end, which seems to have provided space for the lay brothers or conversi.

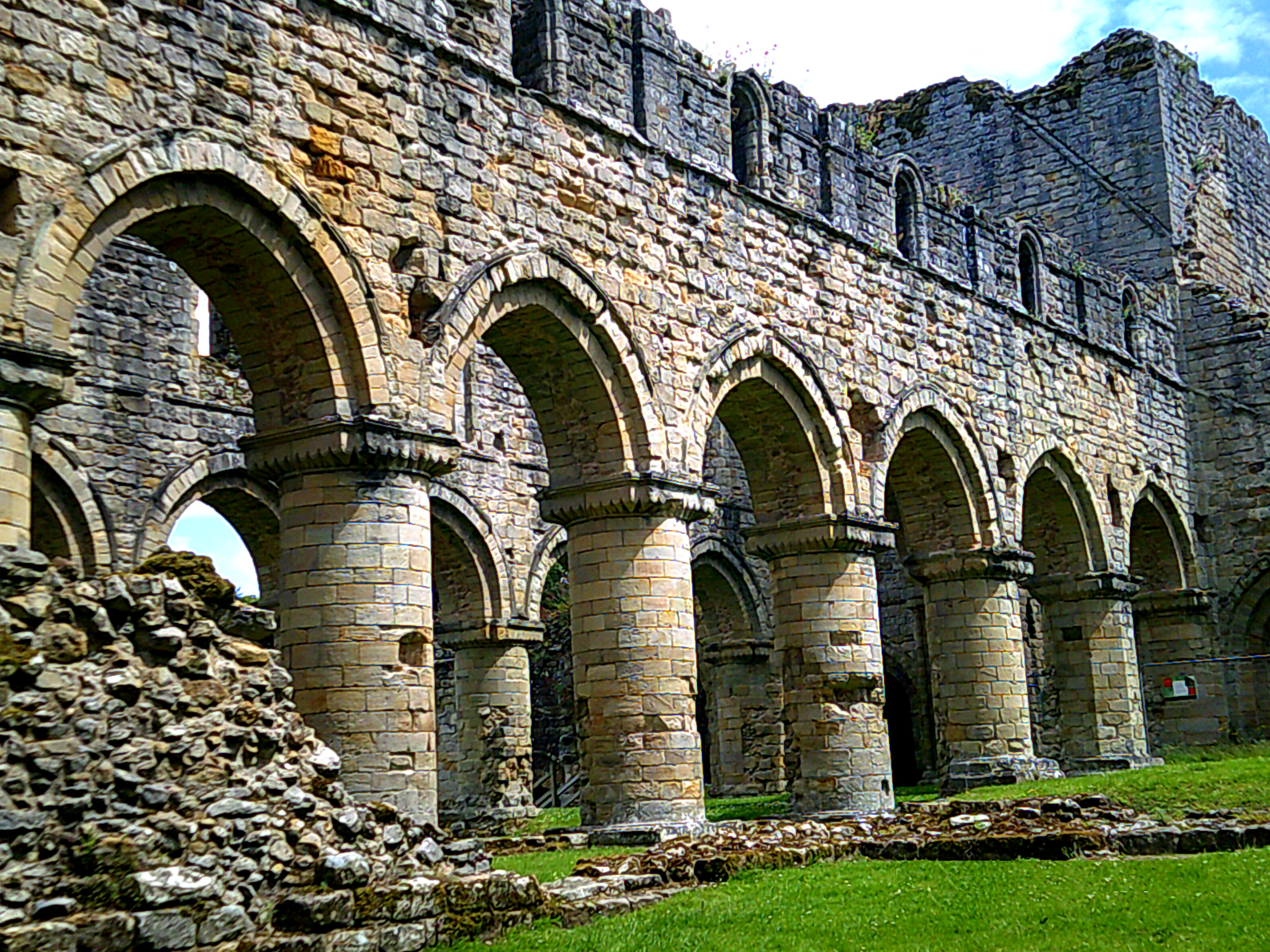
Exterior view of the nave from the south west, showing the bluntly pointed arches. Central tower to right.

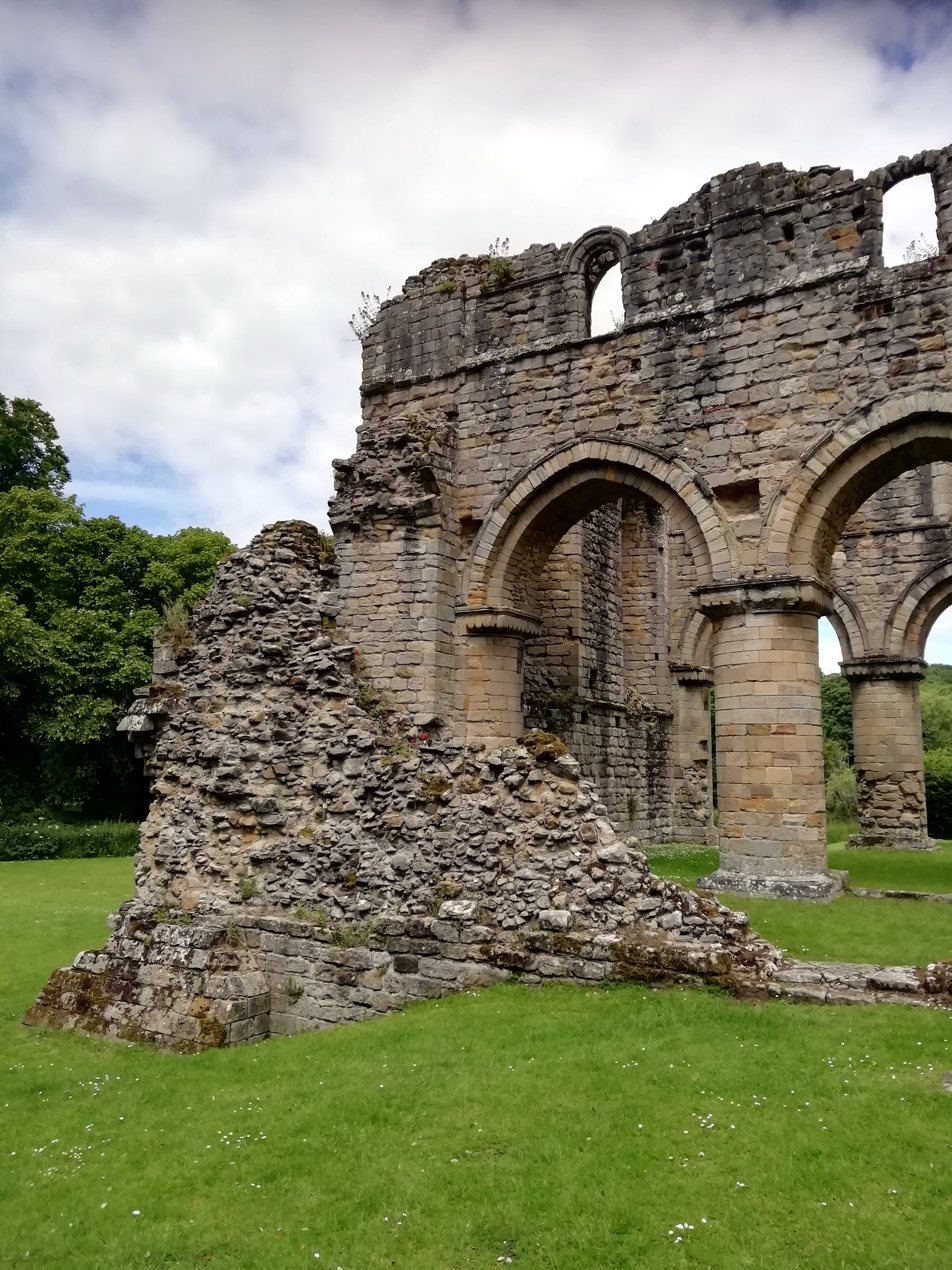
The south west corner of the church, showing all that remains of the abbey's aisle walls and a section of foundation.

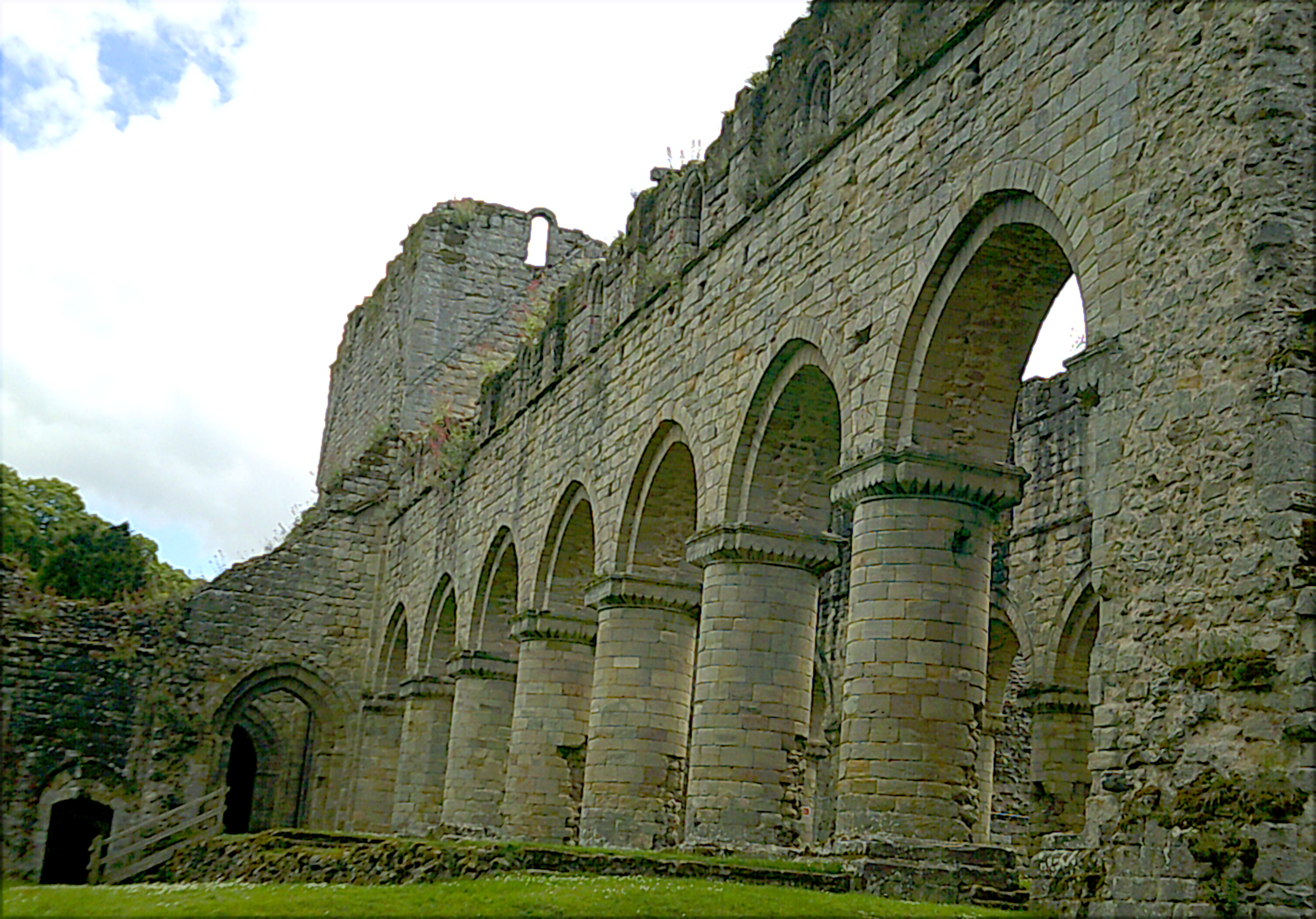
Exterior view of the nave from the north west, showing the massive round-section columns and a doorway into the north transept.

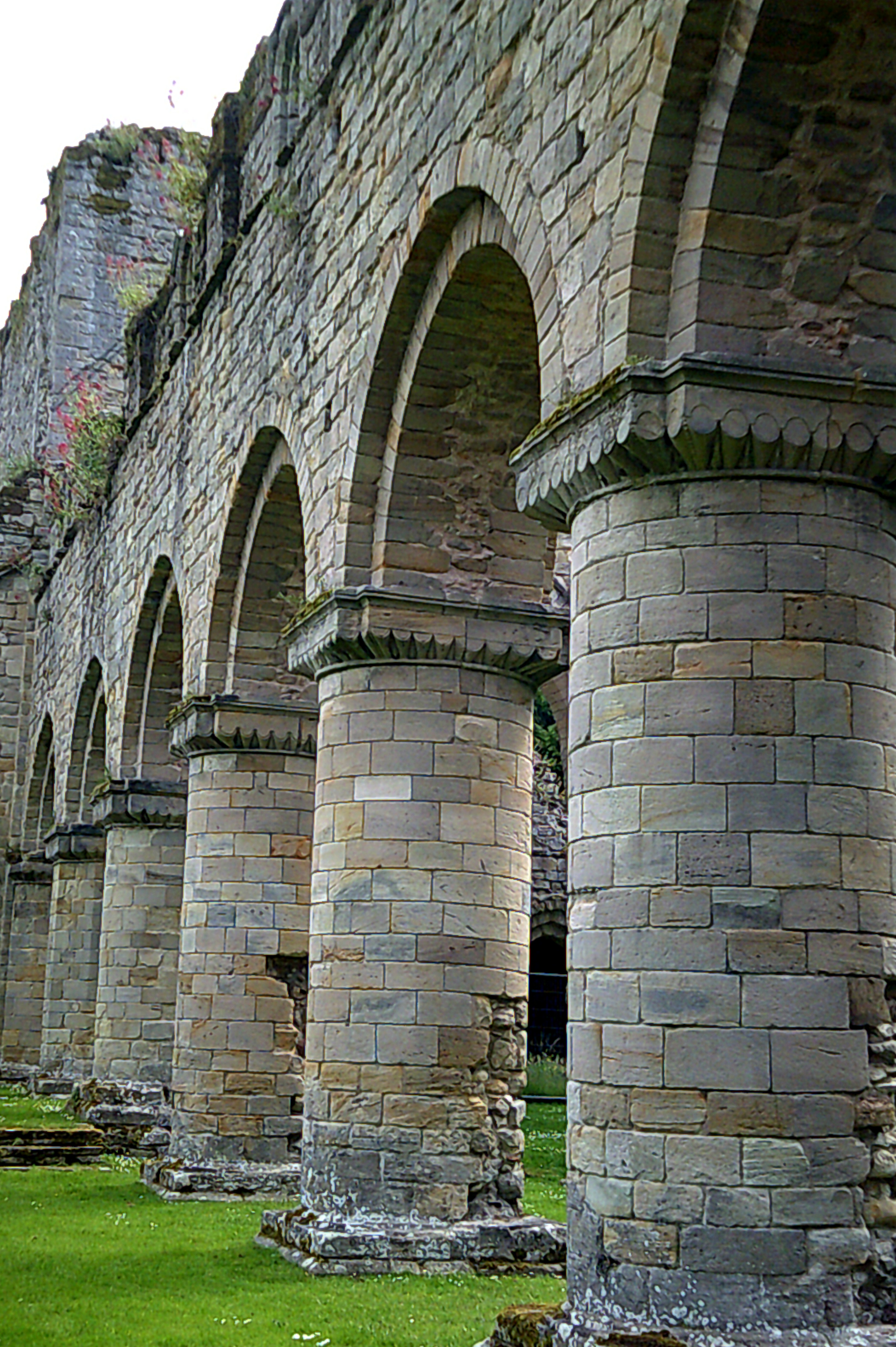
Arches on the north side of the nave, featuring round-sectioned columns with scalloped capitals.

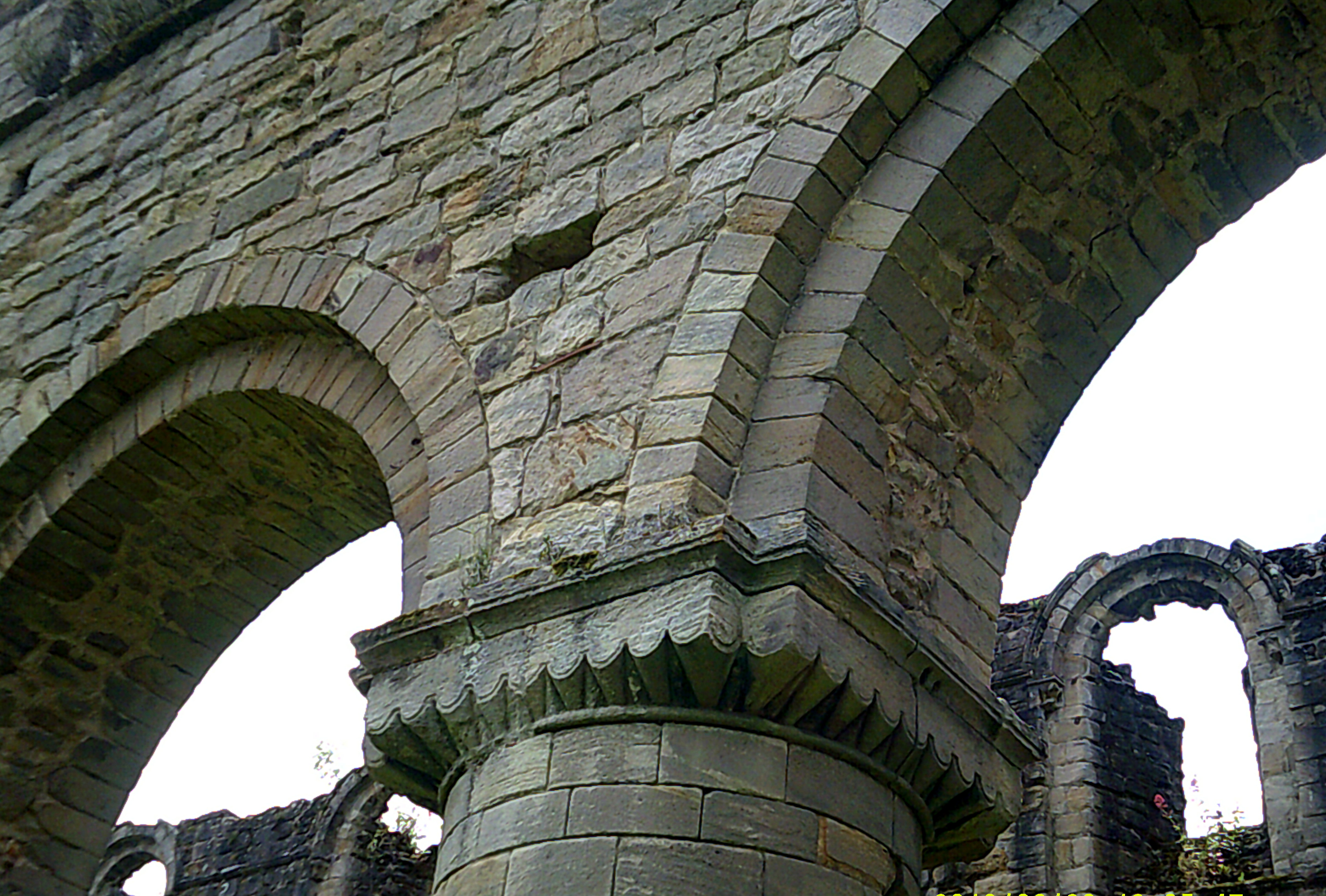
Capital of a column in the north nave, showing scalloped decoration. Above it a putlog hole, used for supporting scaffolding during construction.

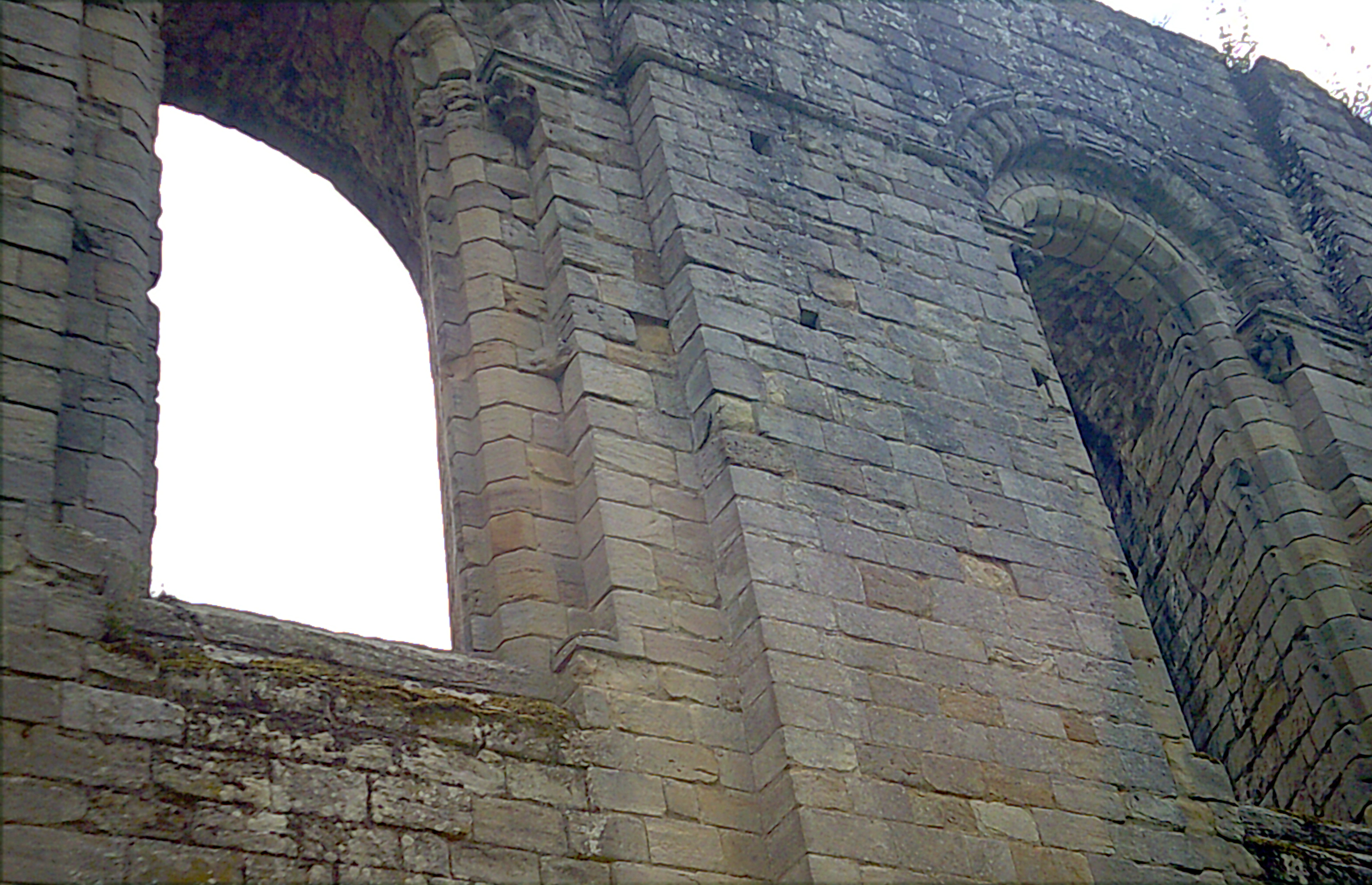
A section of clerestory seen from inside the nave, with delicately carved capitals suspended after the loss of the jamb shafts.

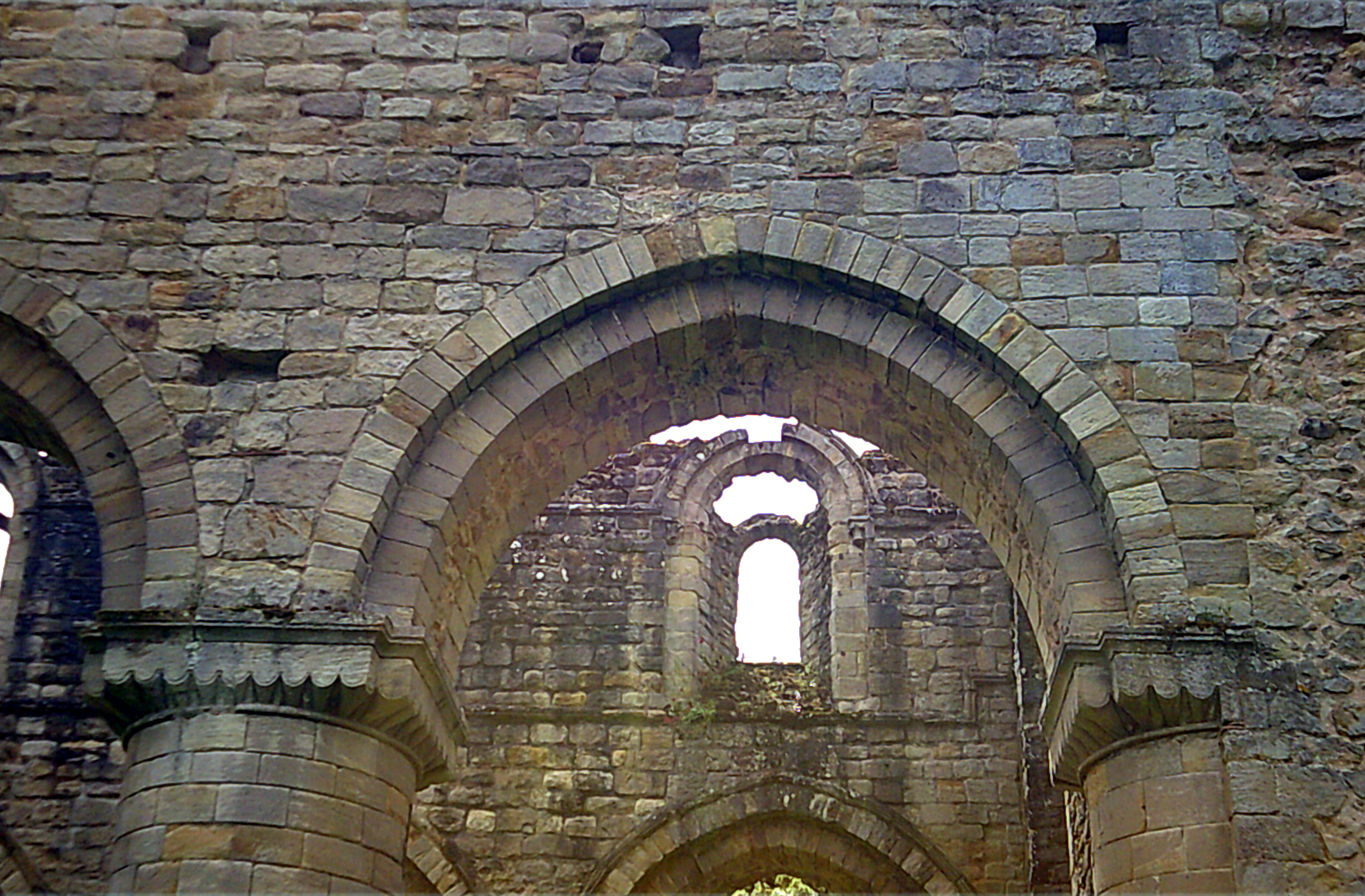
Arch on north side of nave with scalloped capital and a view through the building to the clerestory on the south side.

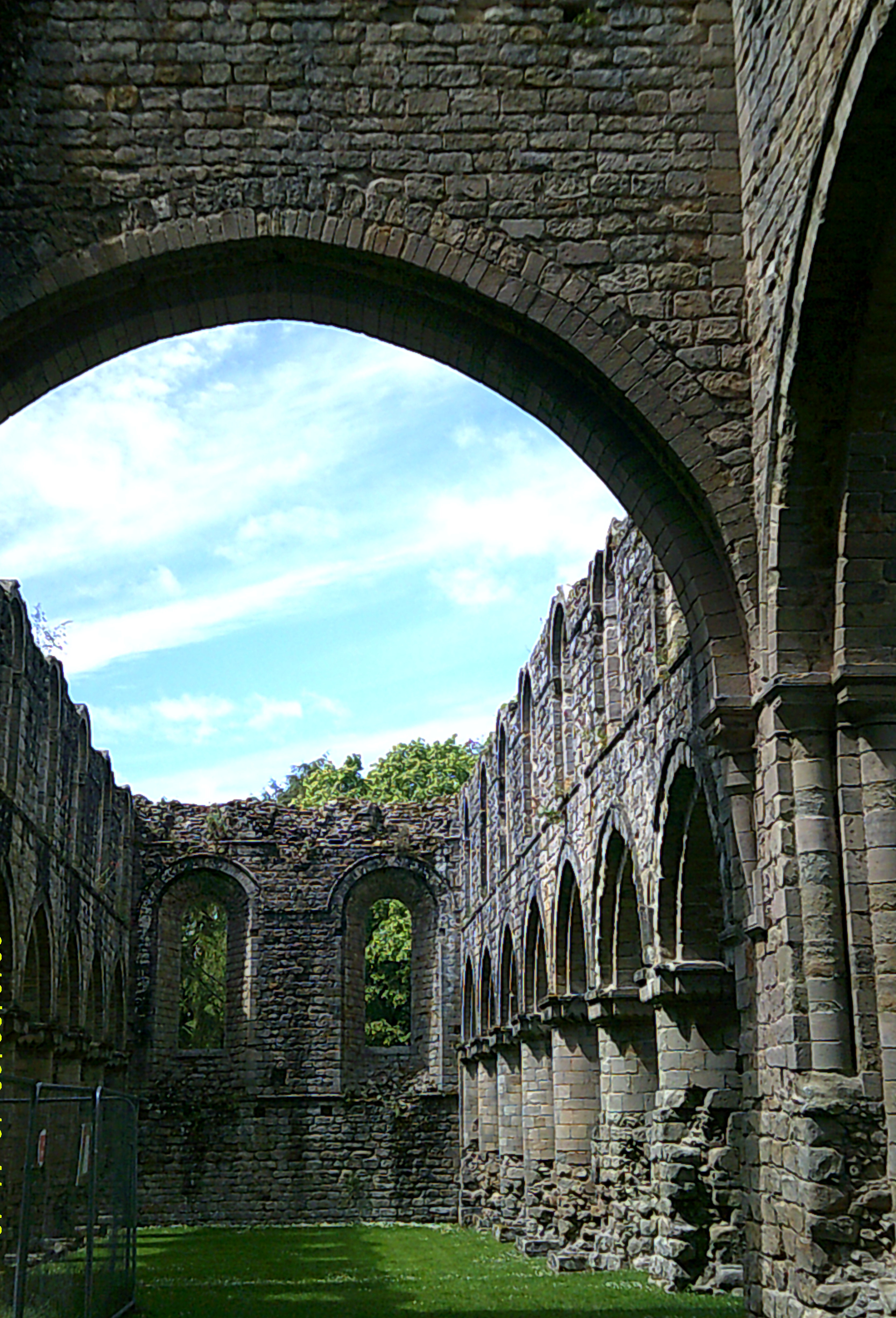
A view of the west windows and the nave seen from the church crossing, looking under a corbel arch supporting the central tower.

The quire or monk's choir took up the two eastern bays of the nave as well as the crossing. The western foundation of the rood screen that divided it from the rest of the nave is discernible between the second piers of the nave. There are traces of altars that flanked the entrance through the screen. The central tower or roof lantern is suspended over the crossing by corbels high in the walls. It was originally entered by stairs at its south east corner, leading up through the roof of the transept chapels. It had just two small windows on each side to admit light. The four transept chapels vary only slightly in design and were each equipped with an ambry and a low piscina for the almost constant celebration of chantry masses.

The presbytery was originally screened off from the rest of the church. The triplet of eastern windows was inserted after the construction of the church to replace an earlier pair. The altar would have stood forward, detached from the east wall. There are triple sedilia deeply set into the south wall for the priest and two assistants at a High Mass which replaced an earlier and simpler stone bench. Immediately east of these is the piscina or water drain for eucharistic ablutions, in a plain, round-headed recess about 3 feet (0.91 m) across.

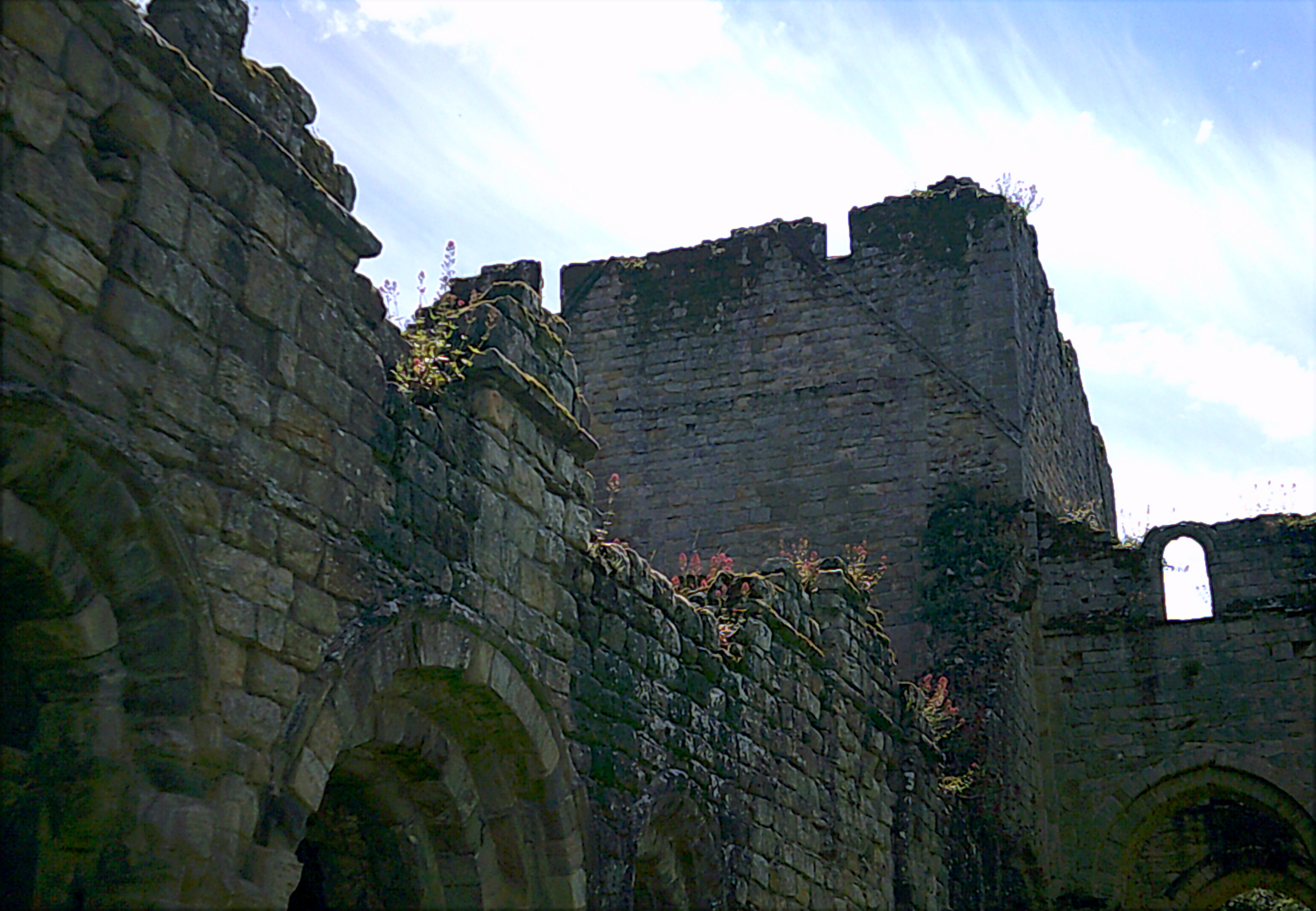
Roof lantern or central tower, viewed from the south west.

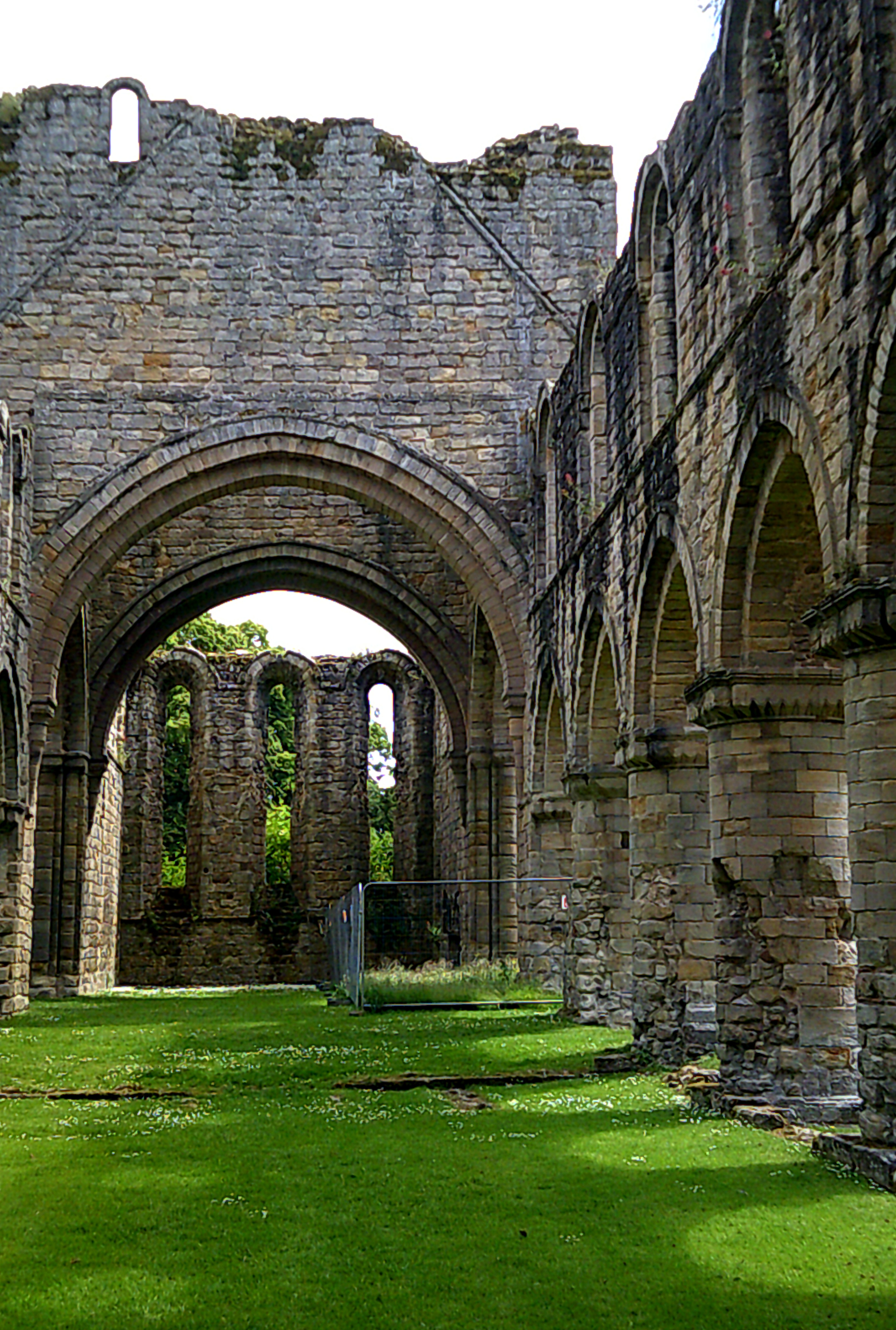
View of the church interior, with the triple window in the eastern wall of the chancel, viewed through the arches supporting the central tower.

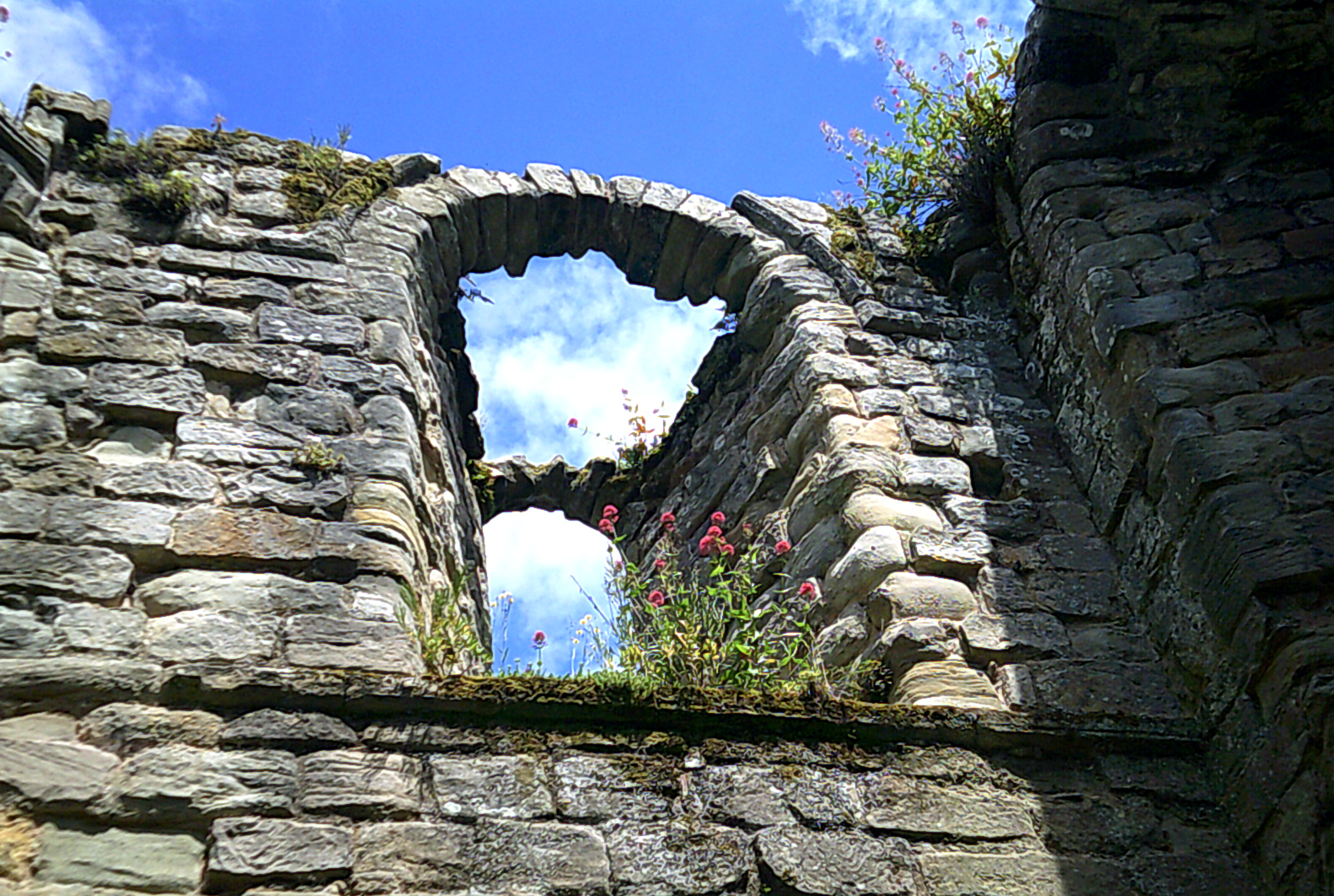
The north clerestory of the chancel or presbytery viewed from inside the building.

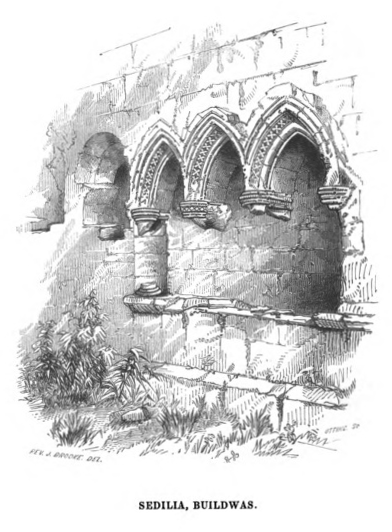
The triple sedilia in the presbytery. From Eyton, R. W. Antiquities of Shropshire, volume 6.

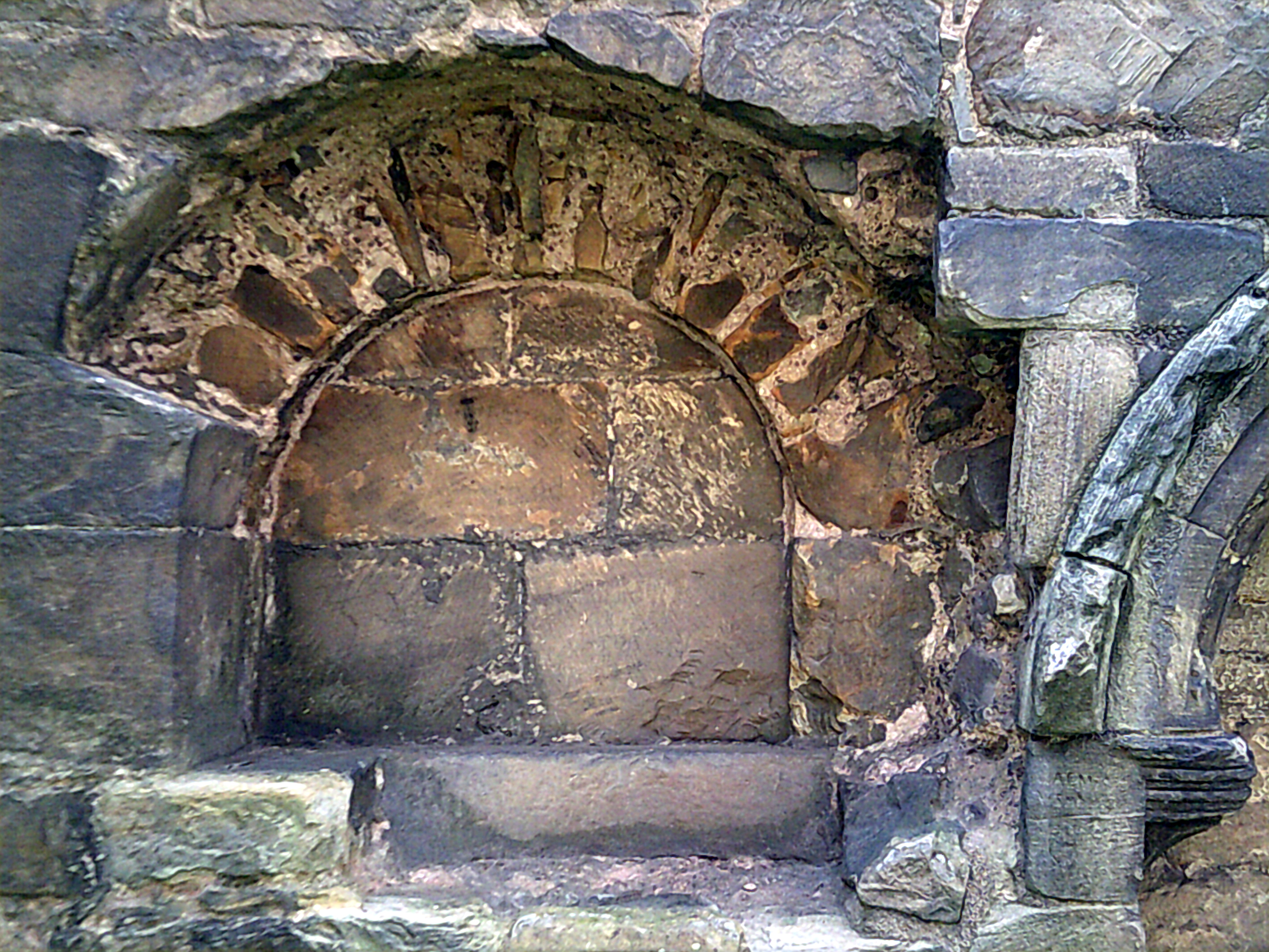
Piscina or wash drain for ritual ablutions in the south wall of the chancel or presbytery.

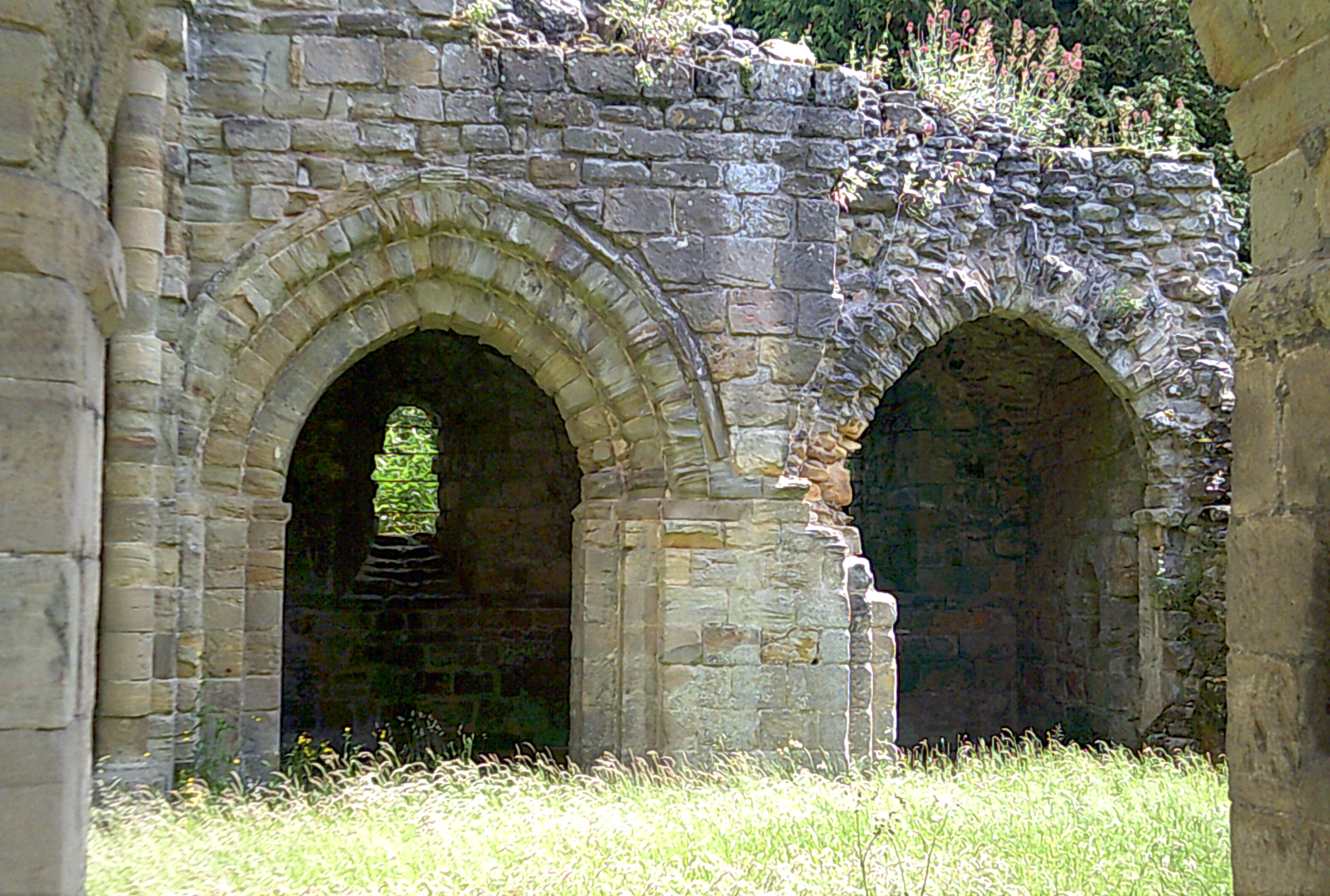
Exterior view through entrances of the two chapels in the south transept.

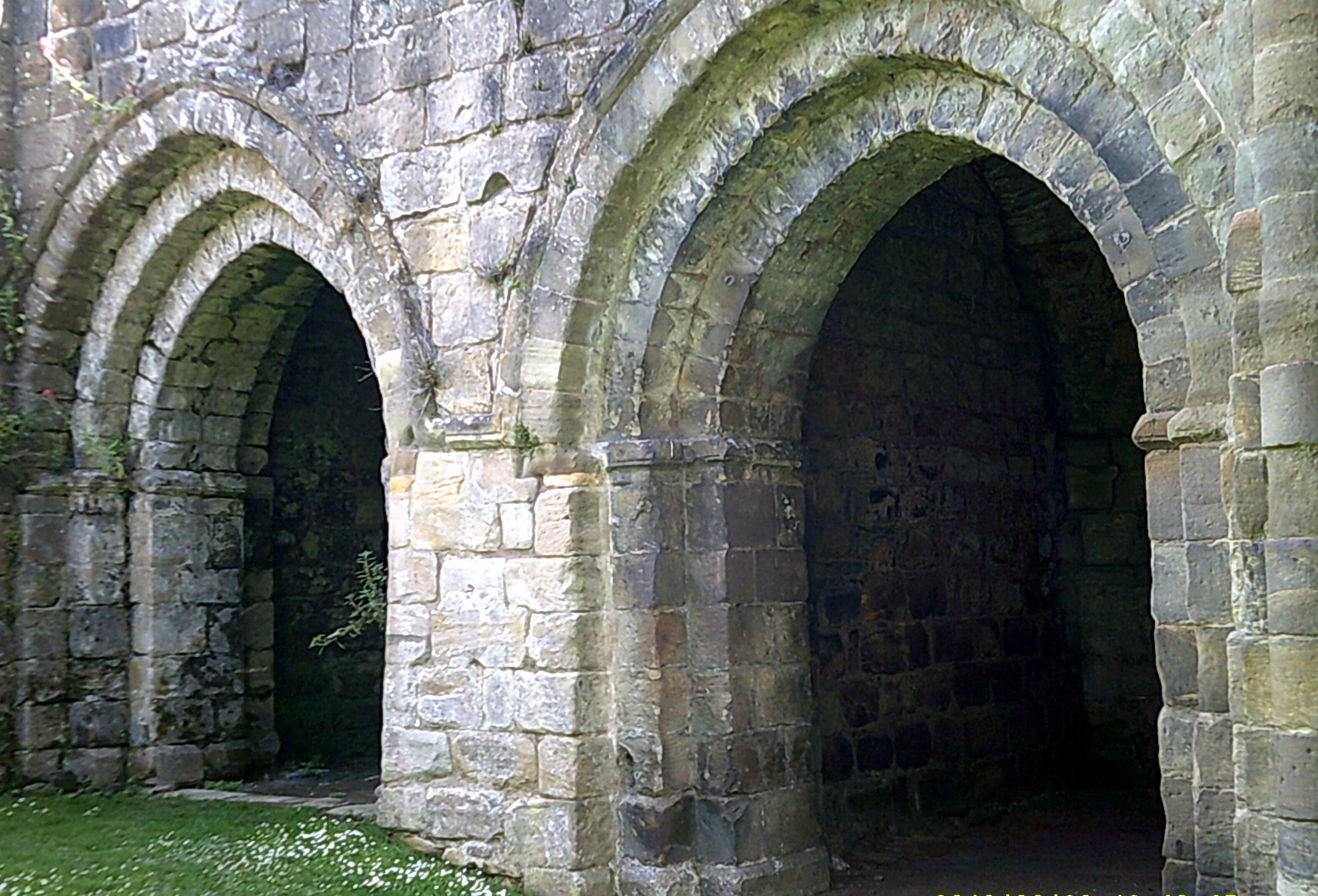
The north transept chapels.

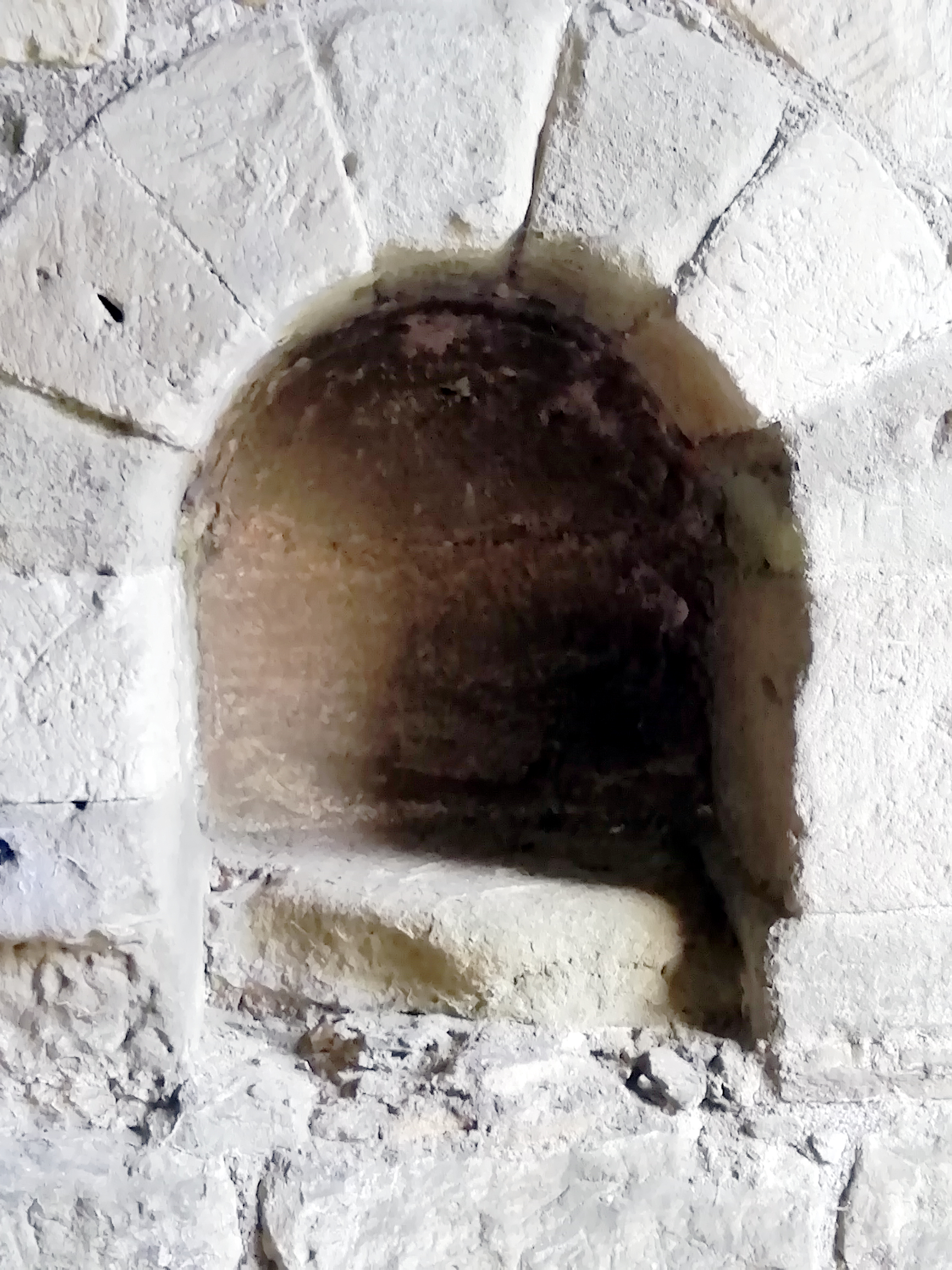
A piscina or drain for washing the eucharistic vessels in the wall of a side chapel in one of the transepts.

==== The Cloister ====
The cloister court lies to the north of the church at a lower level. The foundations of the walls remain on three sides but there is no trace of a cloister arcade, which would have supported a shelter for the monks' walkway. The east range is the best preserved, although the upper storey, which contained the dorter or sleeping quarters of the monks, has disappeared. The extant lower floor contains a sacristy, chapter house and parlour, as well as the entrance to a crypt.

The crypt is entered through a doorway and a flight of steps from the south end of the east cloister range and occupies a space under the north transept. Its roof is a groin vault of three bays. Its original use is unknown and perhaps indeterminate. Walcott suggested it might be a location for confidential conversation, storage for monastic dress or even for laying out of corpses. Today it contains a small collection of items discovered during excavations, but it not always open.

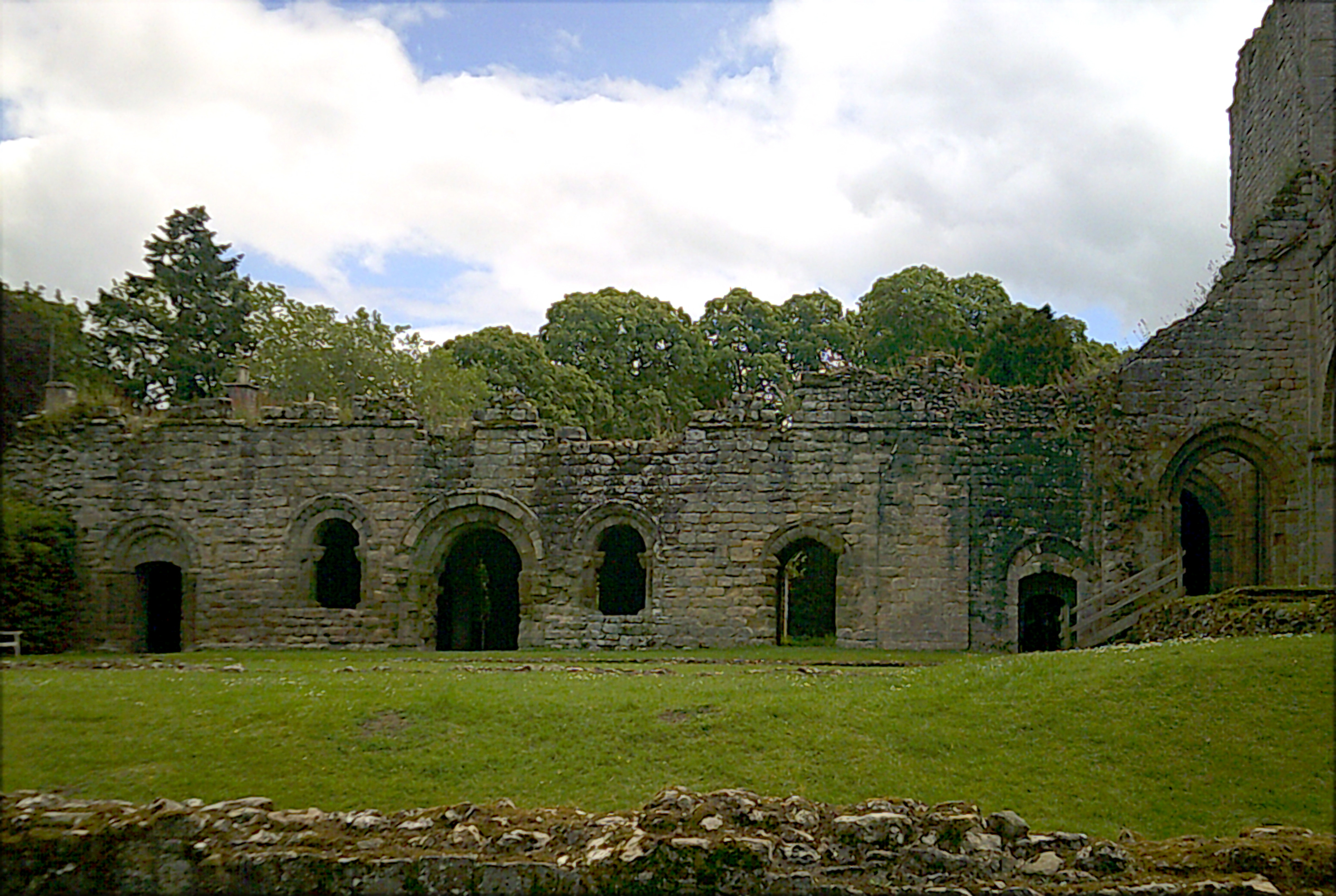
The cloister court, including the sacristy and chapter house, viewed from the north, over the remains of the lay brothers' range.

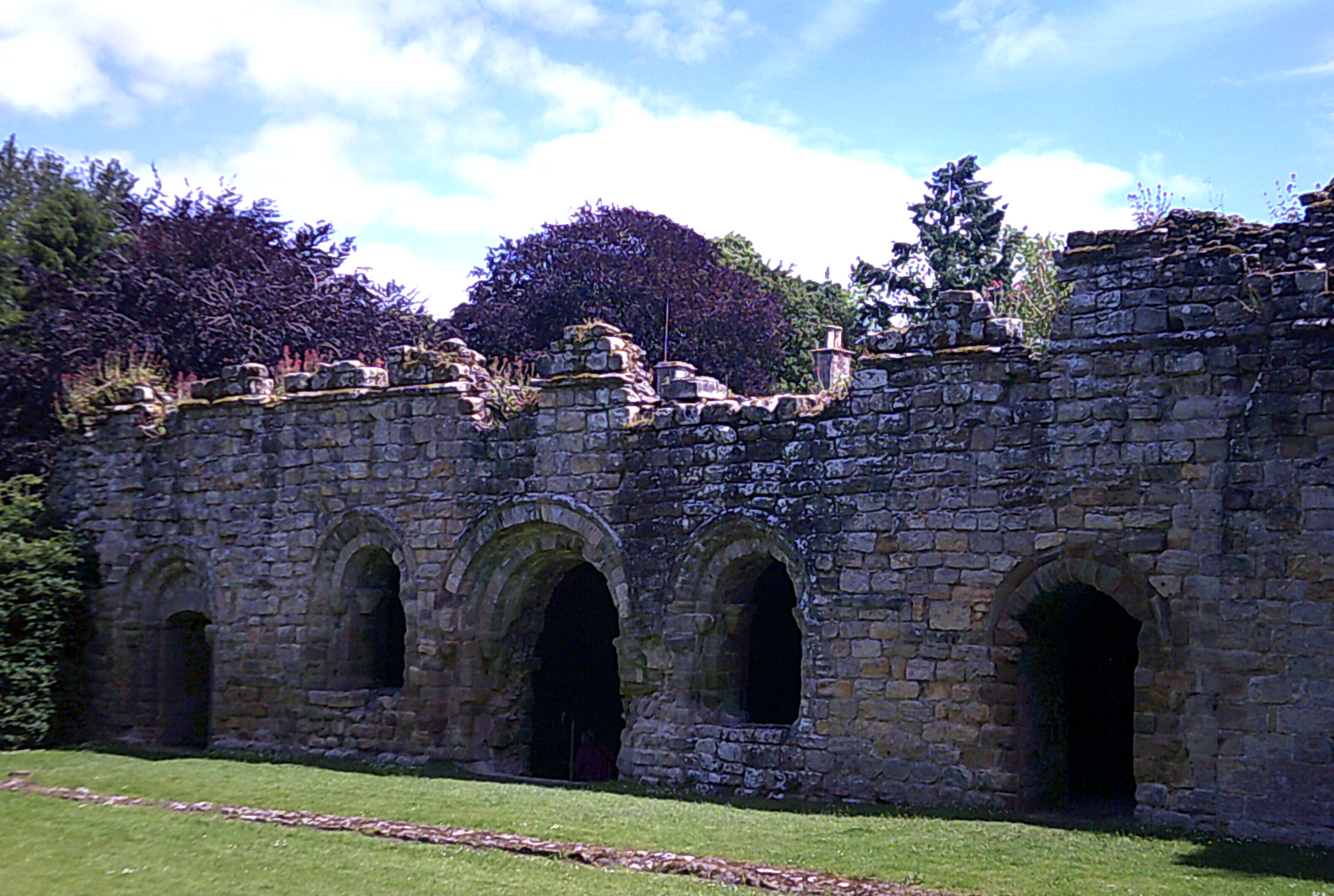
The east range of the cloister. From left: the parlour entrance; two west windows and door of chapter house; sacristy entrance.

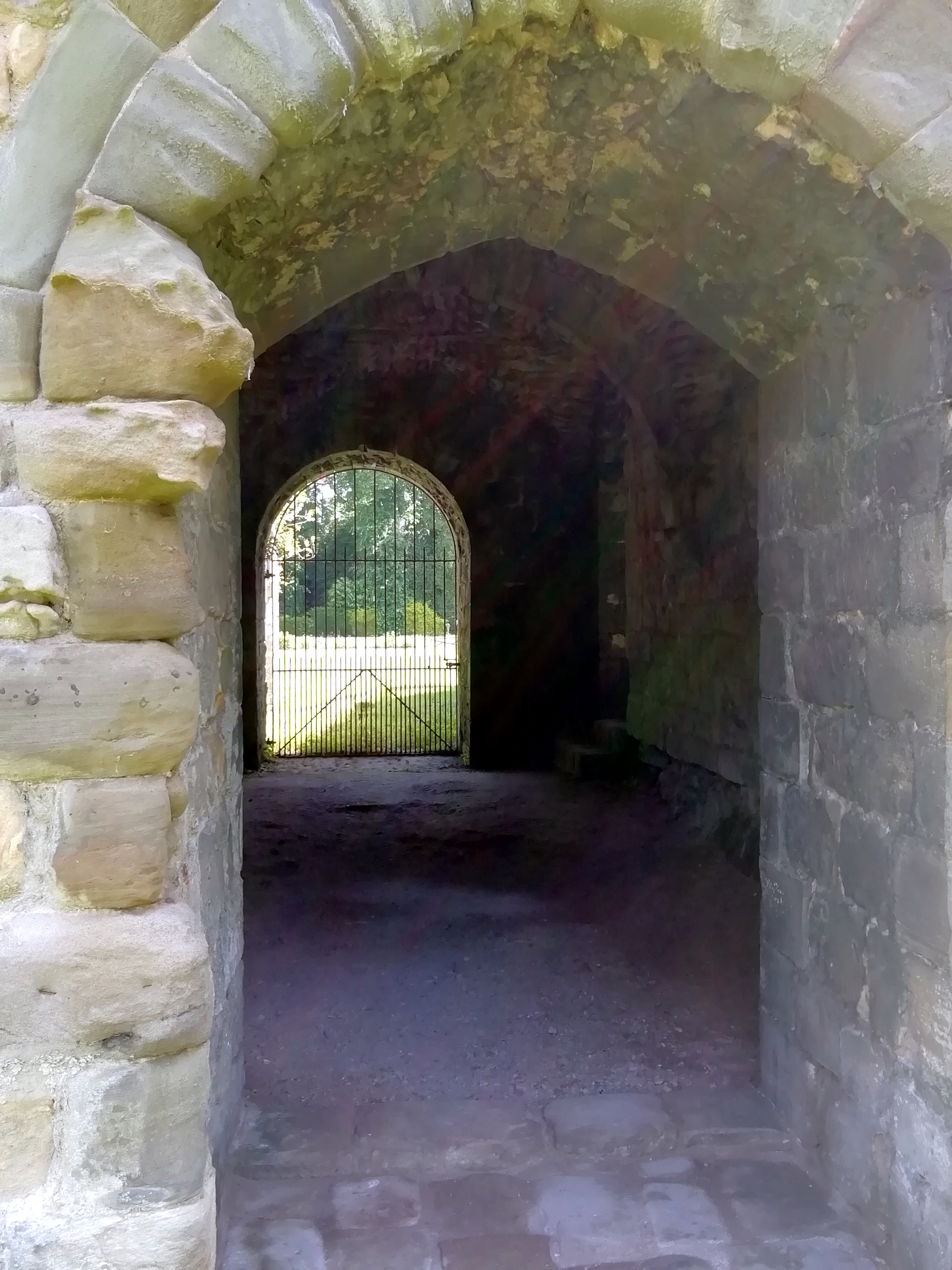
A view of the sacristy through the entrance from the cloister.

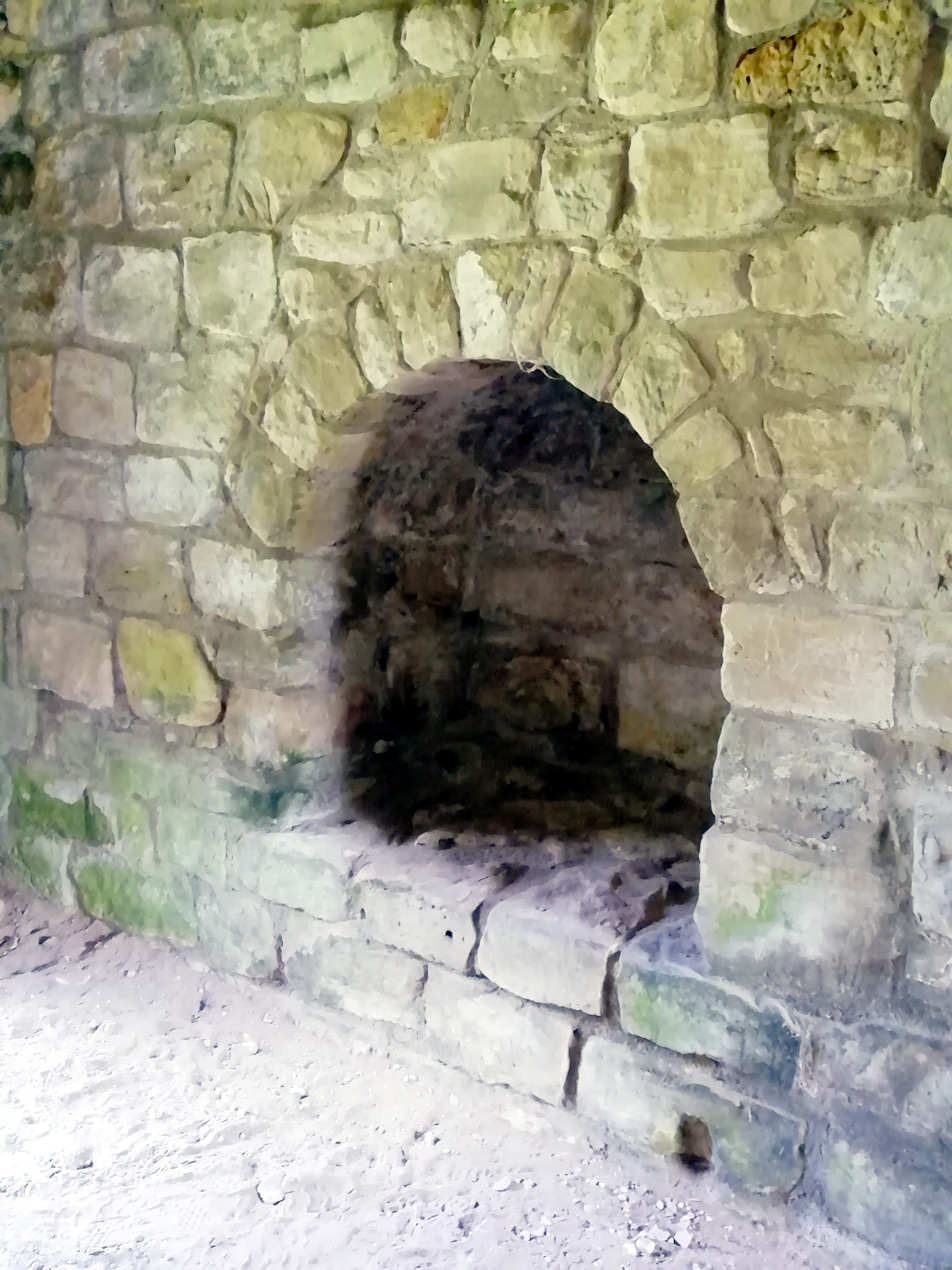
Recess for an ambry, a cupboard used for book storage, in the sacristy.

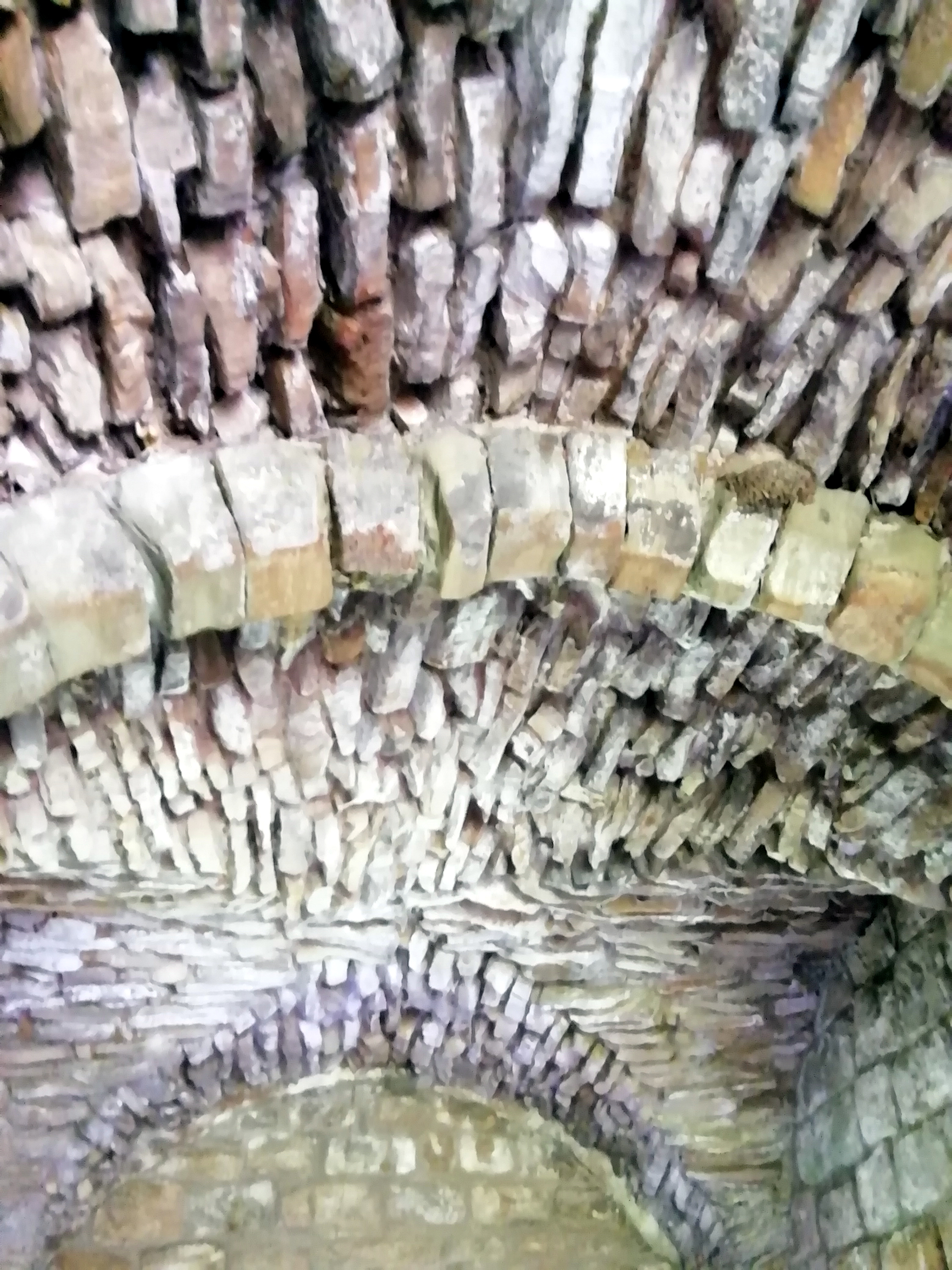
The roof of the sacristy, groin vaulted in two bays.

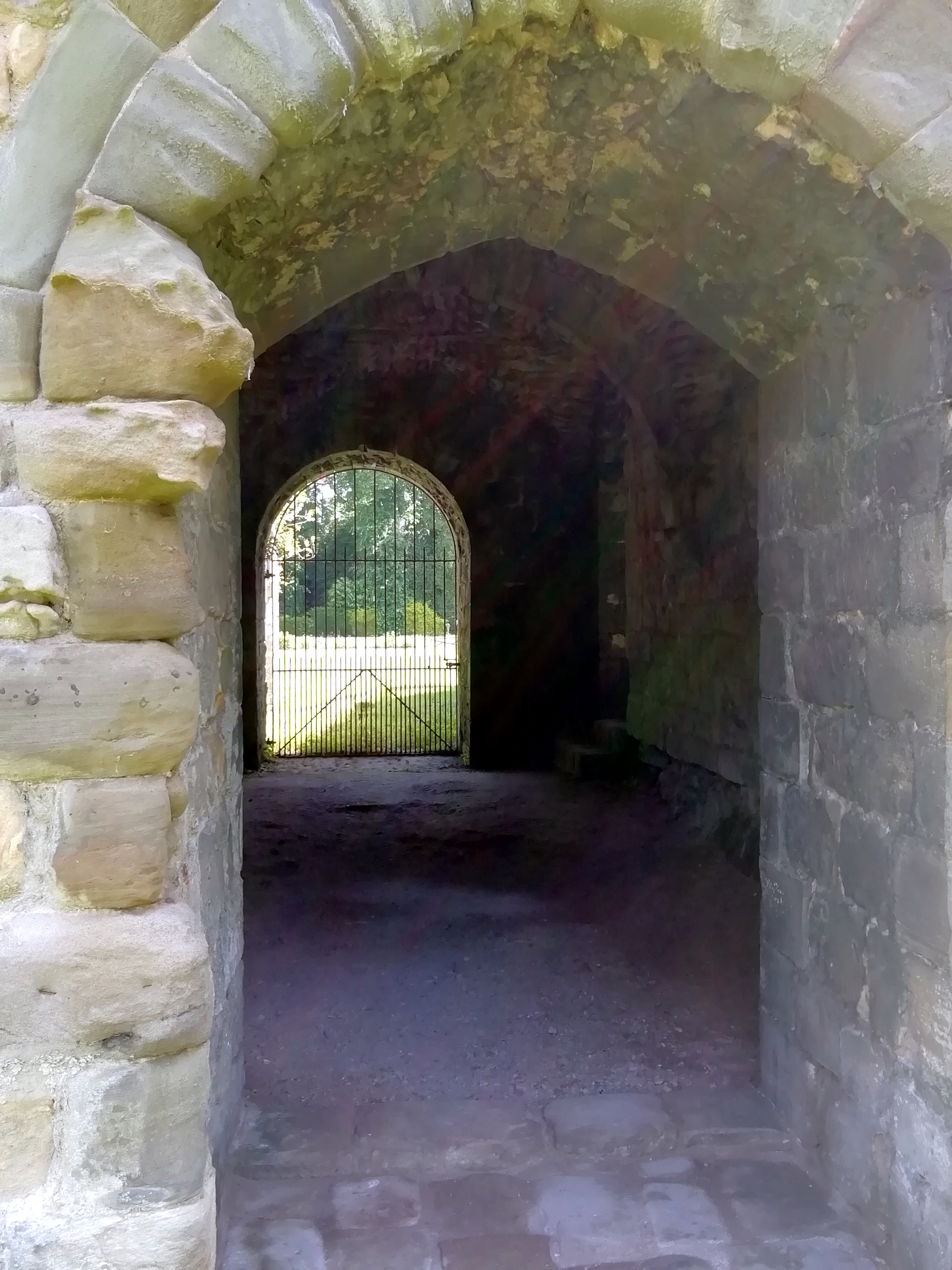
The sacristy seen through the entrance from the cloister, with an external exit that was originally a window.

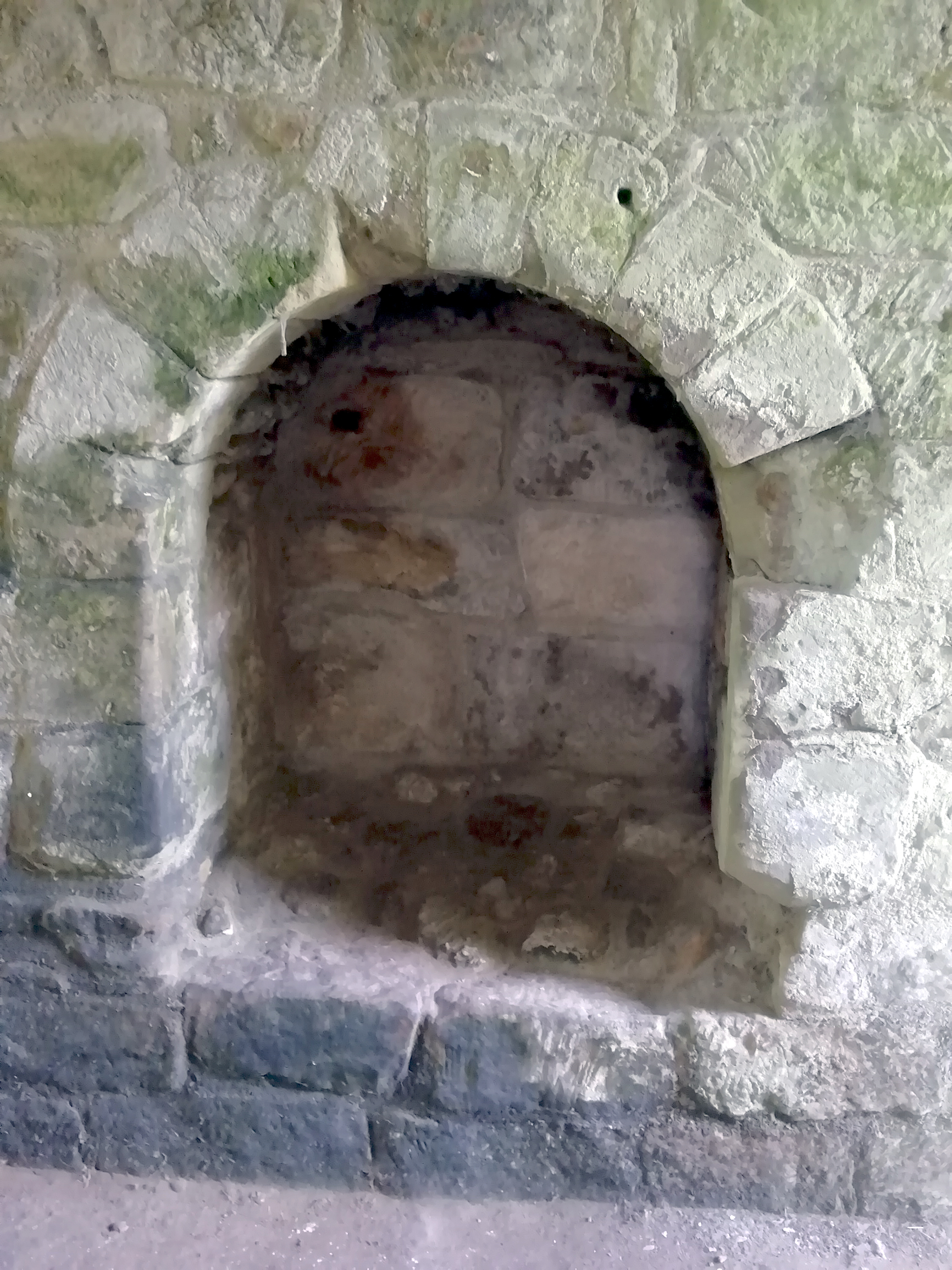
The other ambry recess in the sacristy.

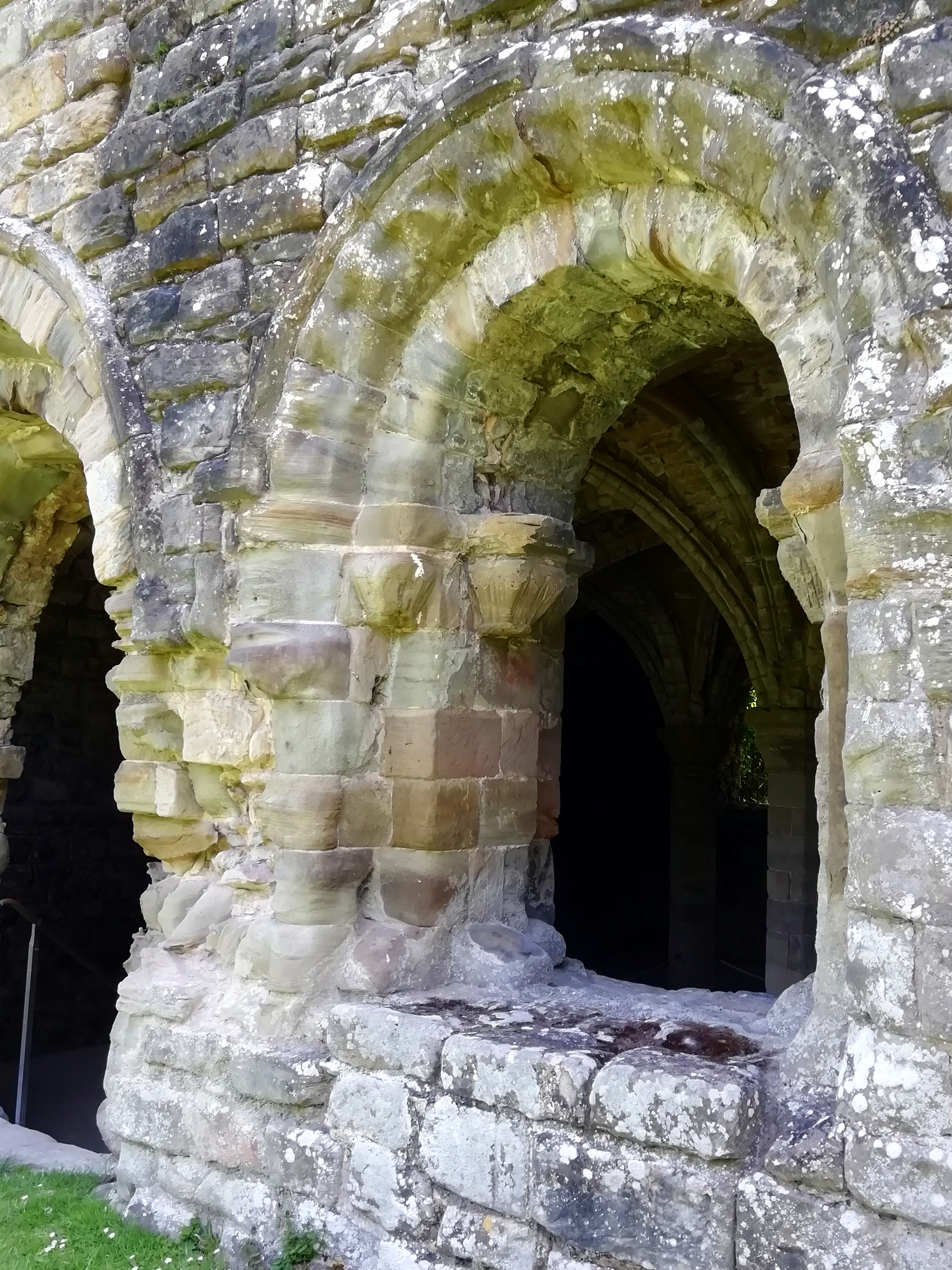
One of the two windows in the cloister wall of the chapter house.

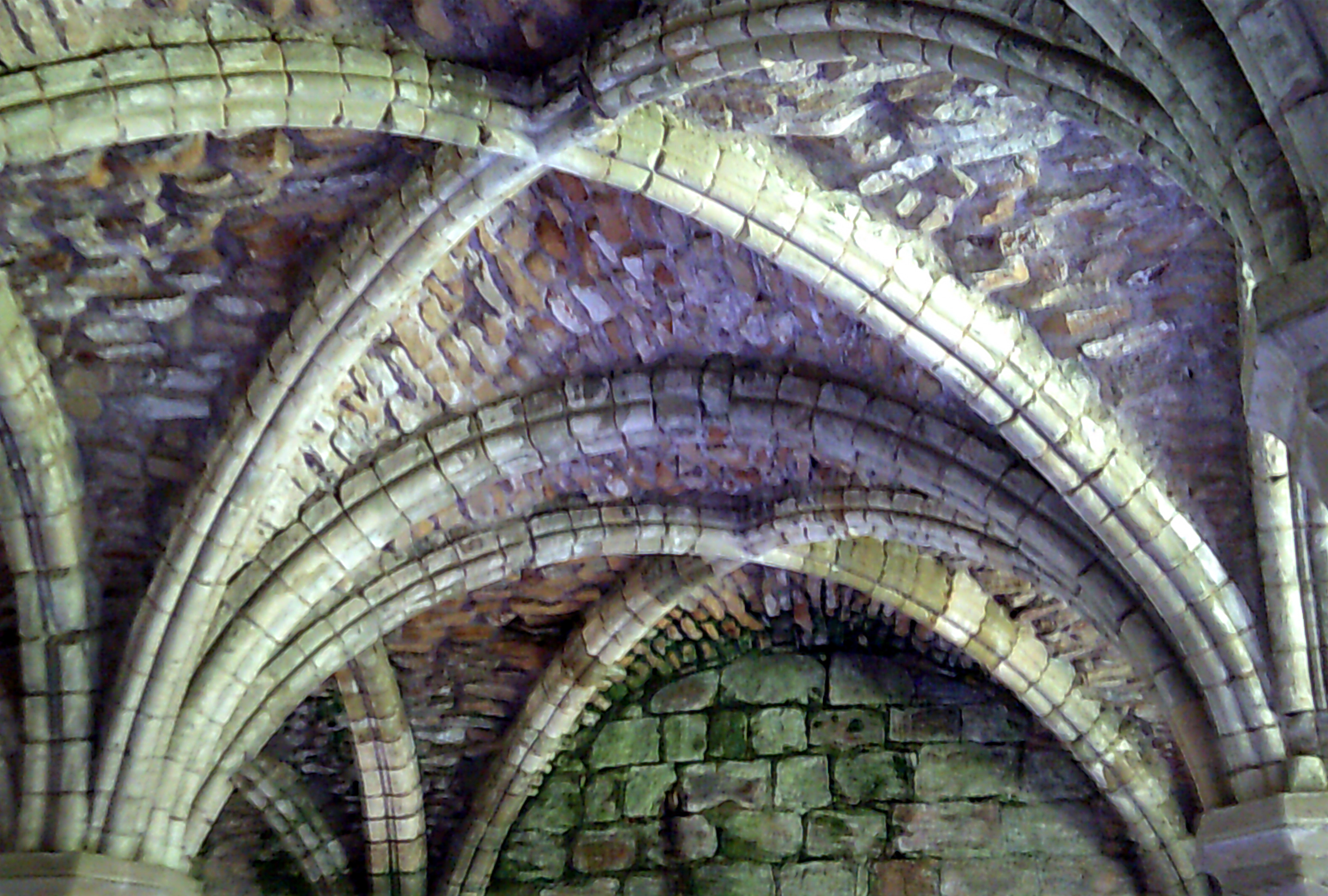
Ribbed vaulting on the roof of the chapter house.

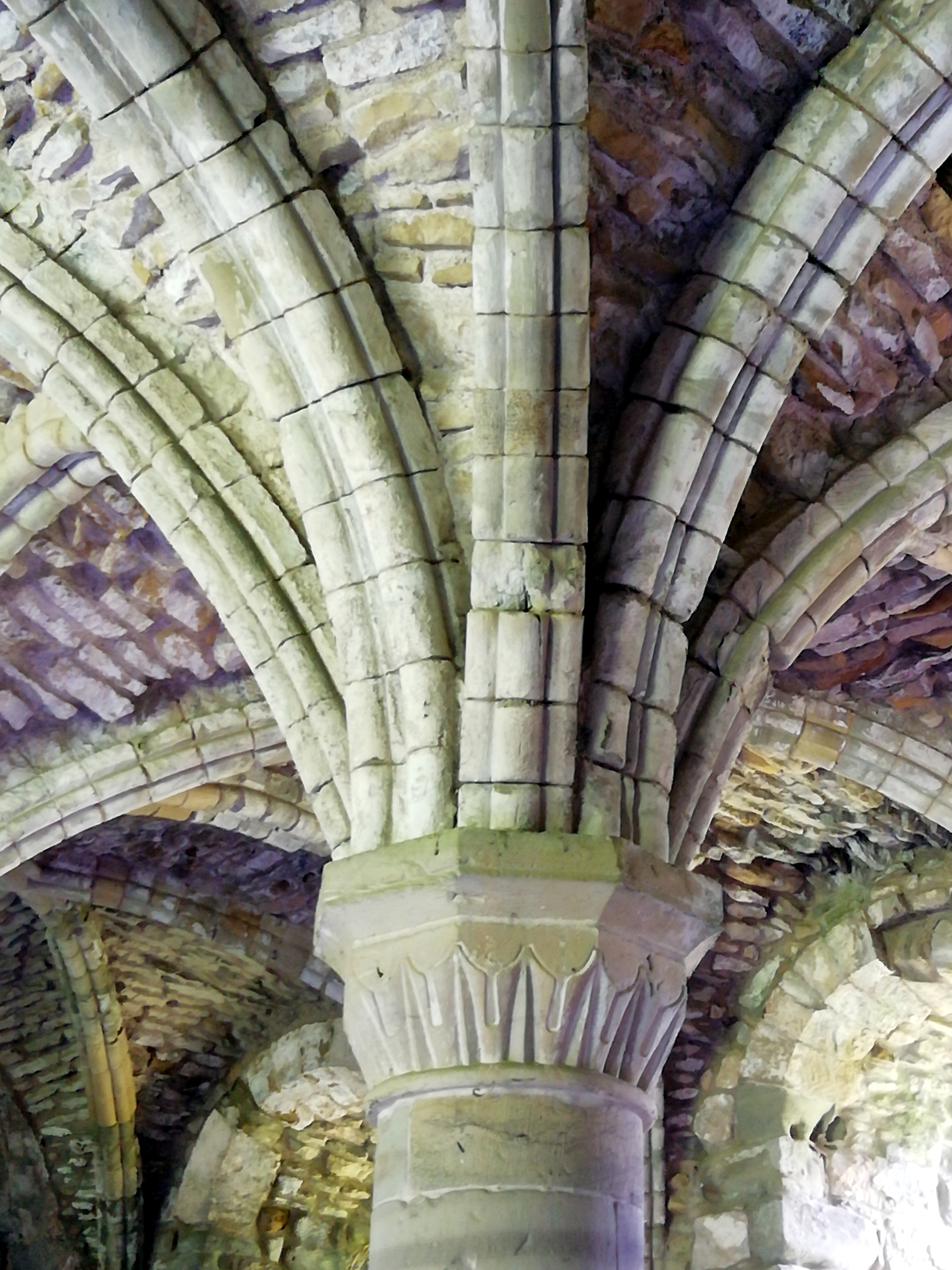
A capital of one of the four columns supporting the rib vaulted roof of the chapter house.

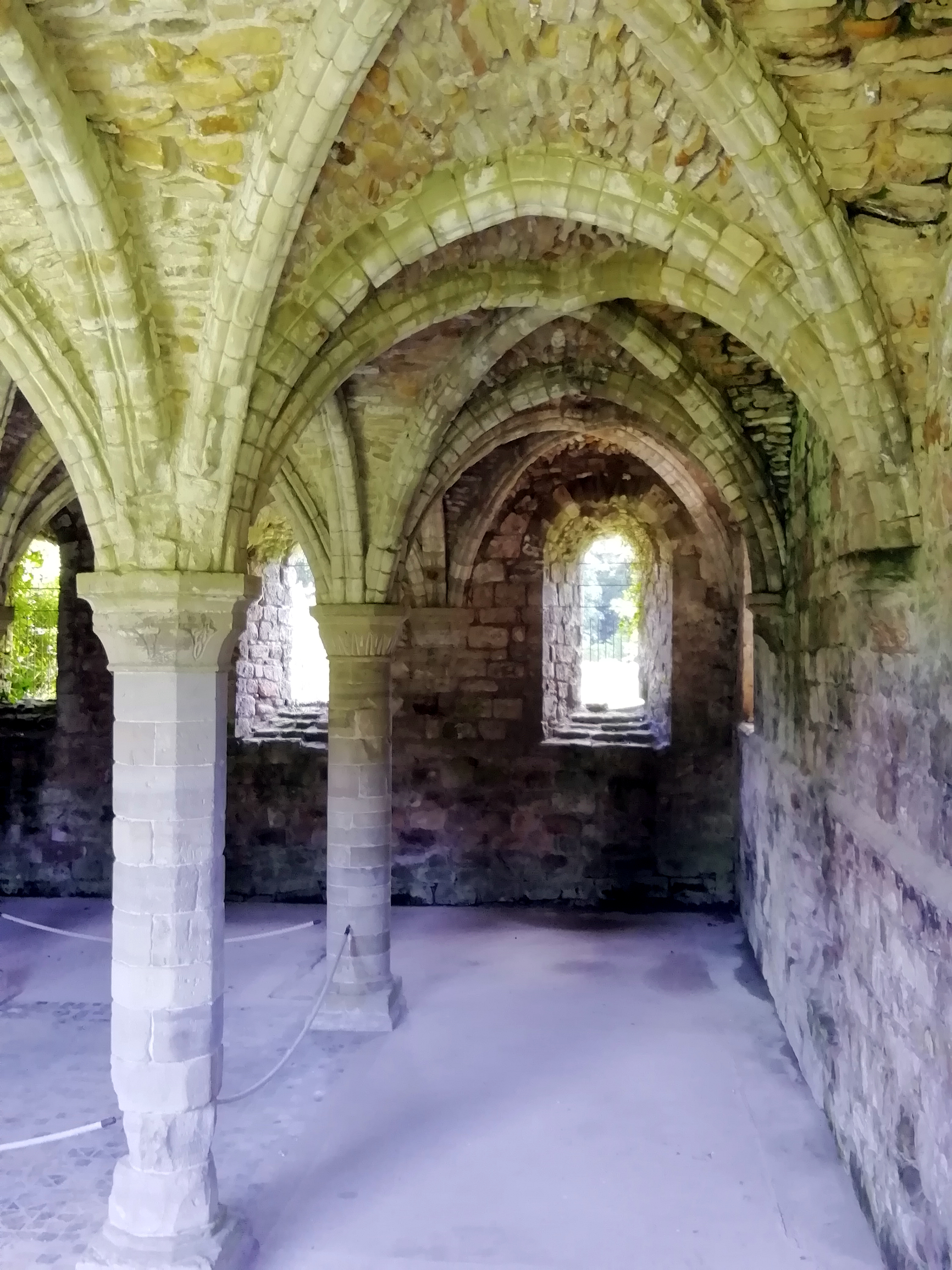
View of the chapter house, showing the three remaining windows in the east wall.

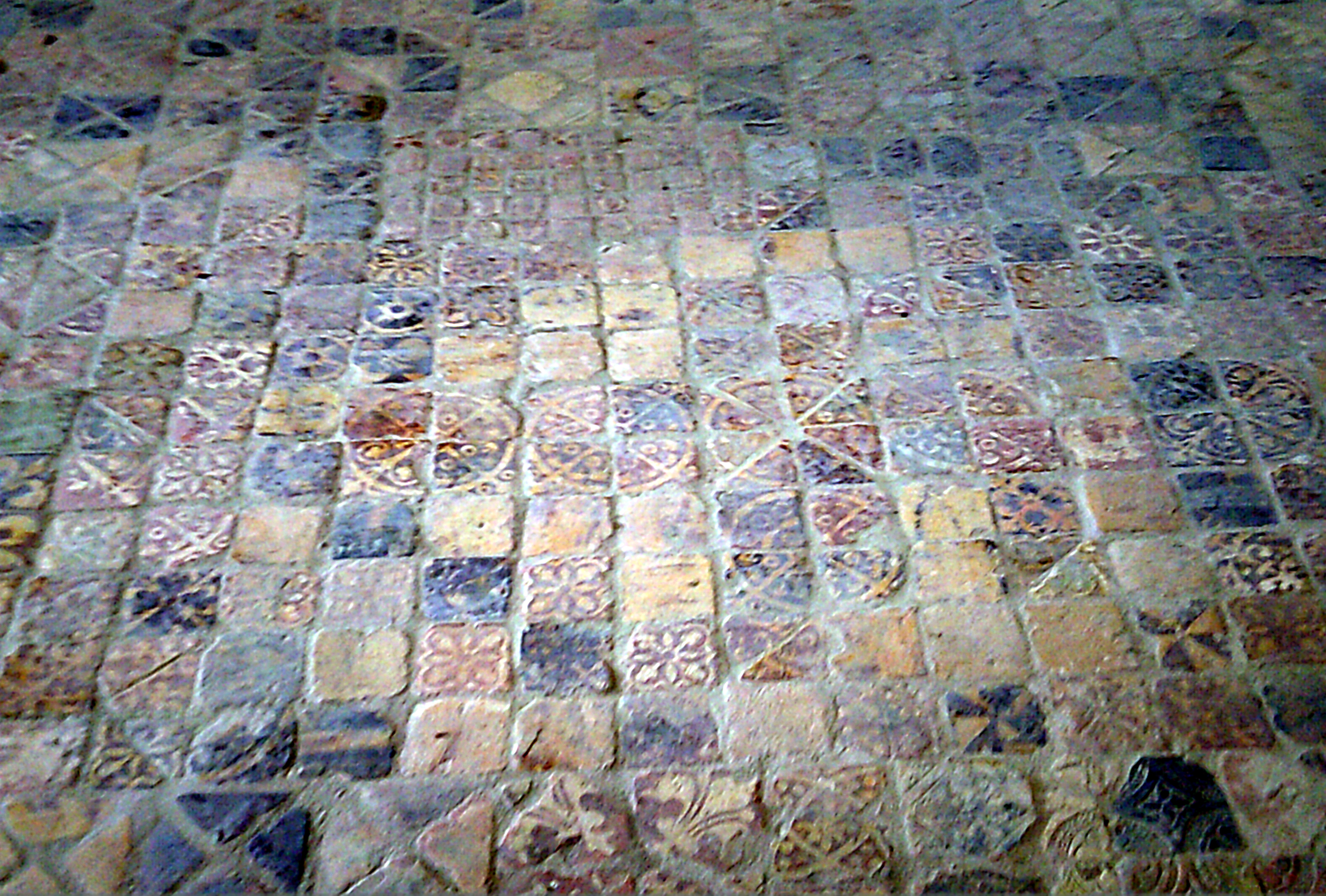
Decorated tiles restored to the chapter house floor.

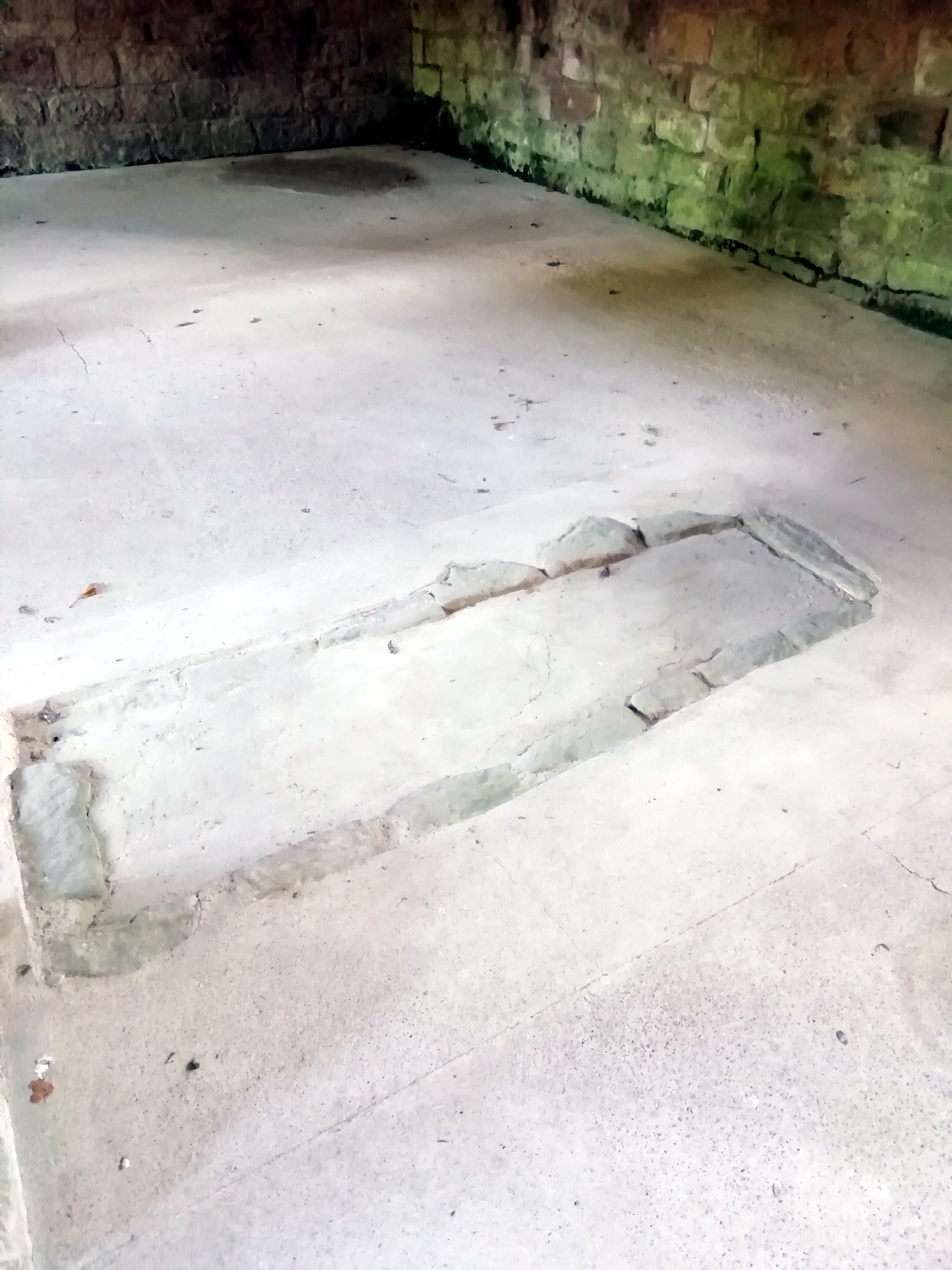
Outline of a tomb in the floor of the chapter house.

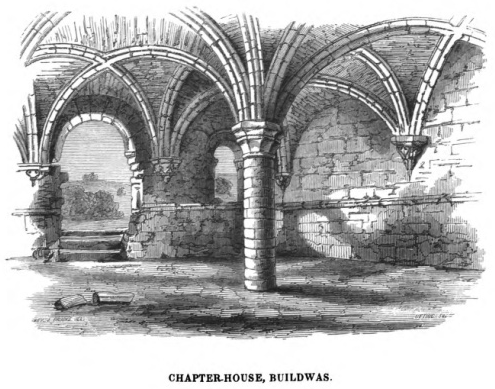
The chapter house as seen in 1858. Internal view from the east end.

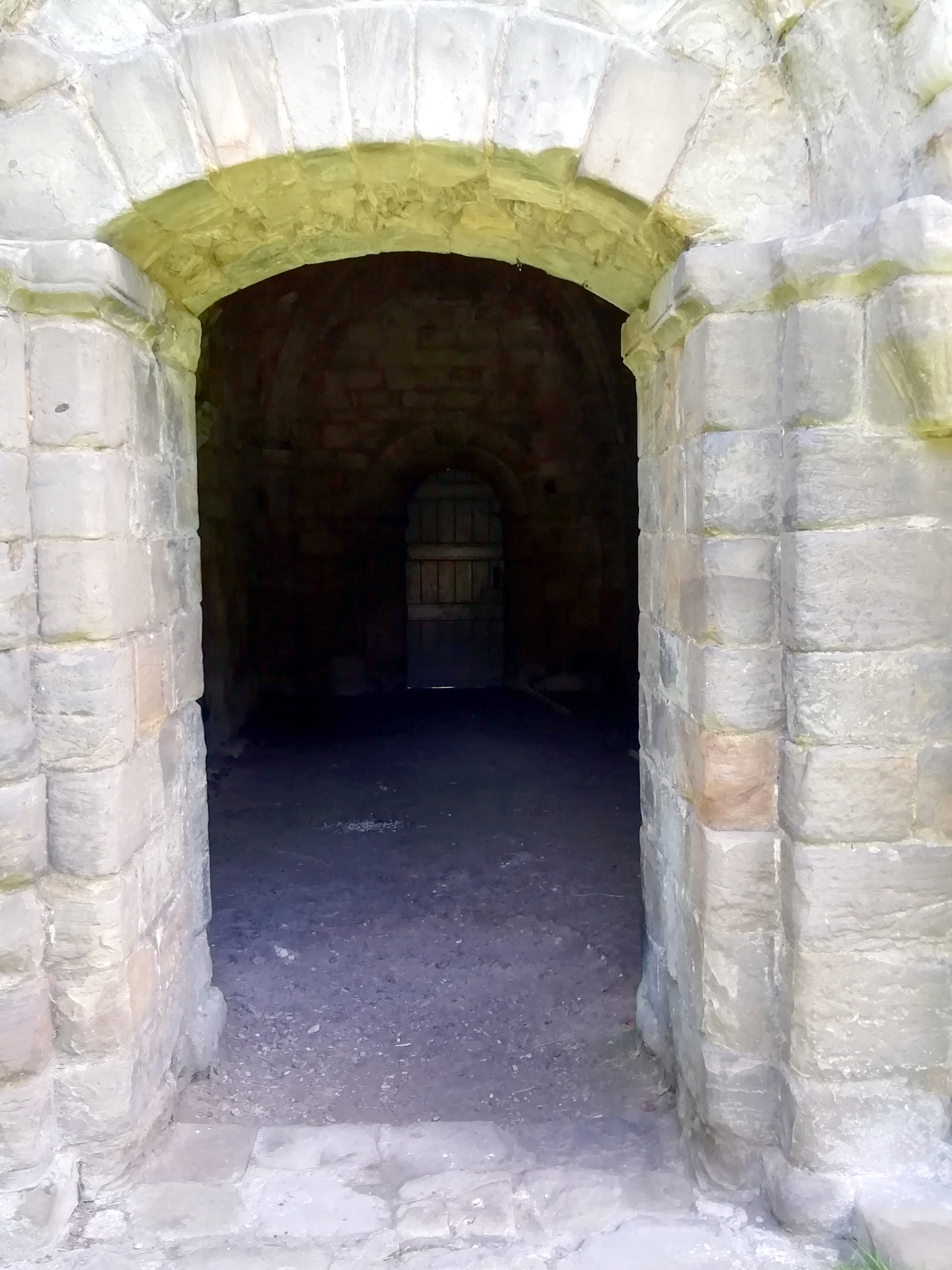
Segmental arched doorway to the parlour from the cloister.

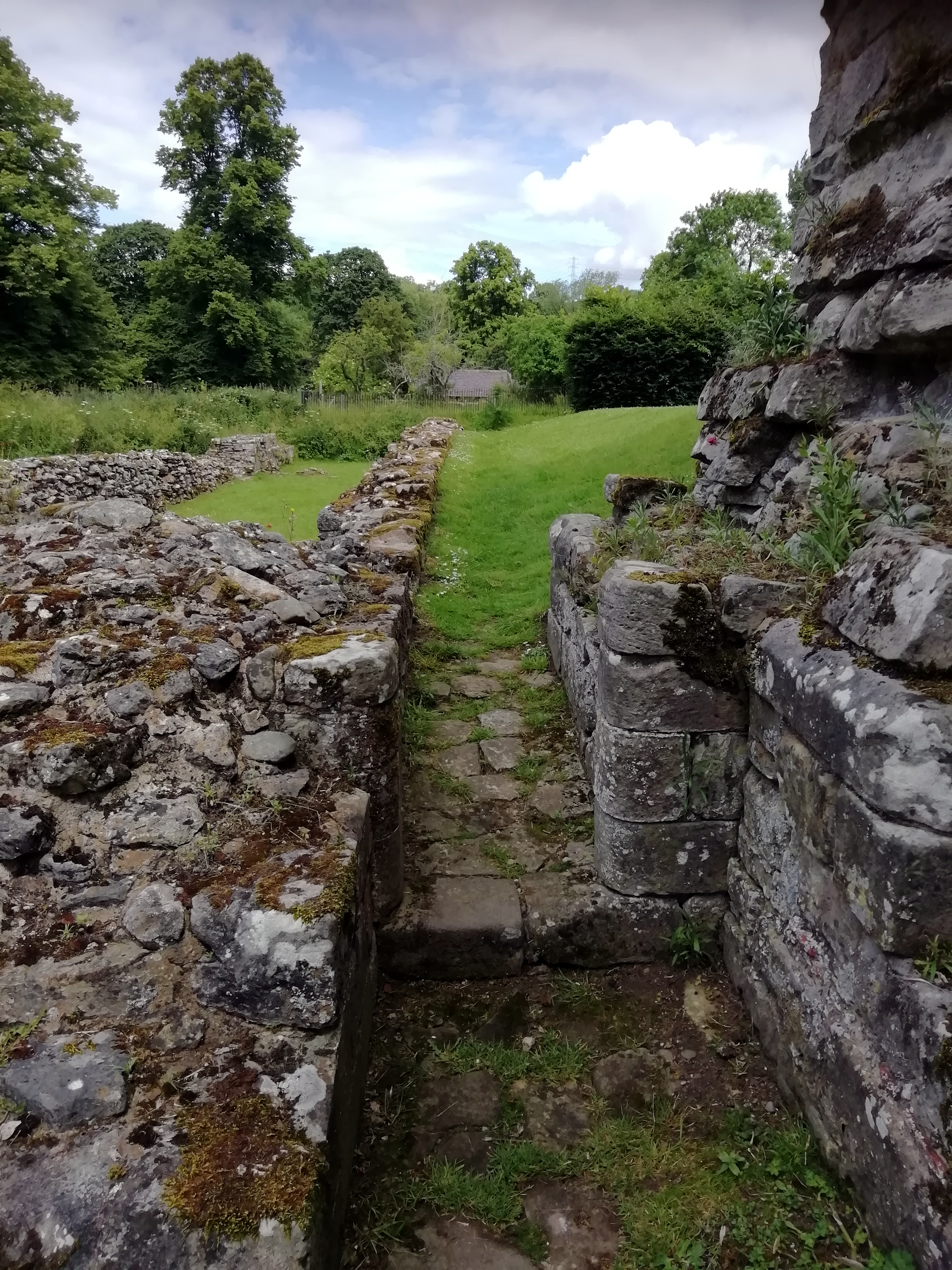
Undercroft of lay brother's range and gap giving entrance to cloister, showing how the building lay separate from the cloister itself.

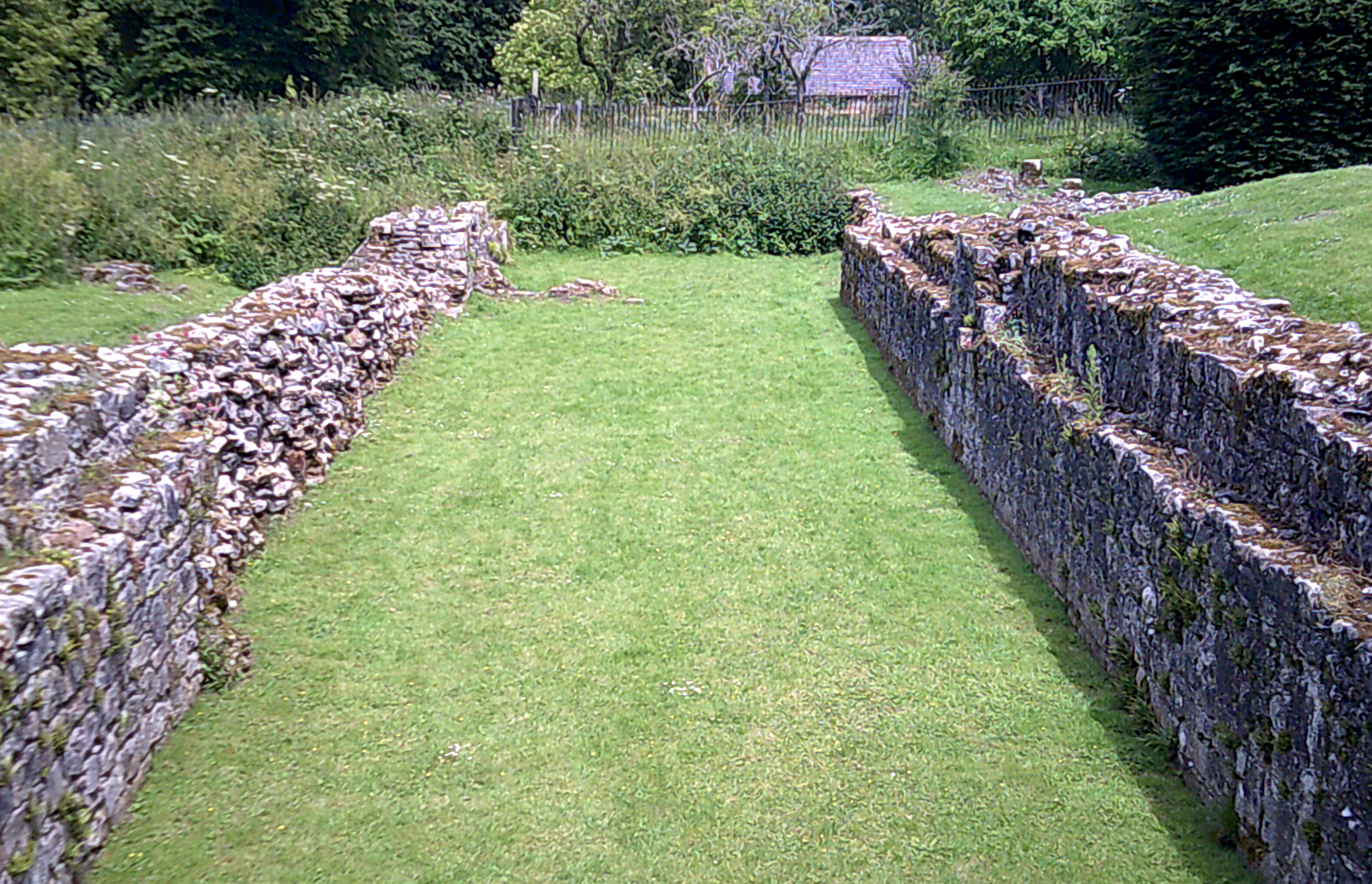
Remains of the lay brothers' range to the west of the cloister, showing the substantial undercroft.

The sacristy, intended to house vestments, the eucharistic vessels (chalices, patens, etc.) and other liturgical items, is entered through a doorway with a semi-circular arch. It has a vaulted roof of two bays. It is a narrow space, only about 10.5 feet (3.2 m) wide. Its north wall has two recesses with plain semi-circular heads. These were ambries or small storage cupboards. For convenient deployment of the sacred vessels, the sacristy is connected to the church through a doorway in its south wall, giving access to a short flight of steps into the north transept. Another doorway in the east wall, giving access to the cemetery, now part of the private residence, was broken through from the original window.

The chapter house, where the community of monks held their daily general gatherings, for reading of the rule and martyrology and for the imposition of penance. It is entered through a doorway from the cloister. This has a semi-circular head and was flanked by two jambs, although the shaft of one is now missing. The floor is well below the level of the cloister, requiring a flight of five steps to reach it. Four columns are spaced at the corners of a rectangle so as to create nine areas of ribbed vaulting, the most spectacular extant roof in the building. The dimensions of the space are 41.5 feet (12.6 m)by 31.5 feet (9.6 m) ant it is lit by three windows in the east wall, which projected beyond the neighbouring sacristy. There were once windows either side of this projecting bay, but they were later filled in. The five wall piercings were possibly a reference to the Five Holy Wounds of Christ. The tiled floor was removed after the dissolution but is now partly restored.

The parlour provided the monks with a room where conversation was allowed. It has a roof made up of two bays of ribbed vaulting. Its entrance from the cloister is through a doorway with a semi-circular arch and there are two further doorways: one in the east wall leading to the exterior and one in the north wall to the undercroft.

North of the parlour the visible ruins peter out and lie partly on private land. There must have been a staircase to access the sleeping quarters above the undercroft. The north range would have housed the frater or refectory where meals were eaten together, a vital part of community life. The kitchen was probably at the west end. The west range housed the lay brothers' quarters. This was separated from the cloister itself by a 'lane' and the drop in level allowed it to rise to three floors, although the very large basement is all that remains.

== See also ==
- Grade I listed buildings in Shropshire
- Listed buildings in Buildwas
