= Haughmond Abbey =

Ruined monastery in Shropshire, England

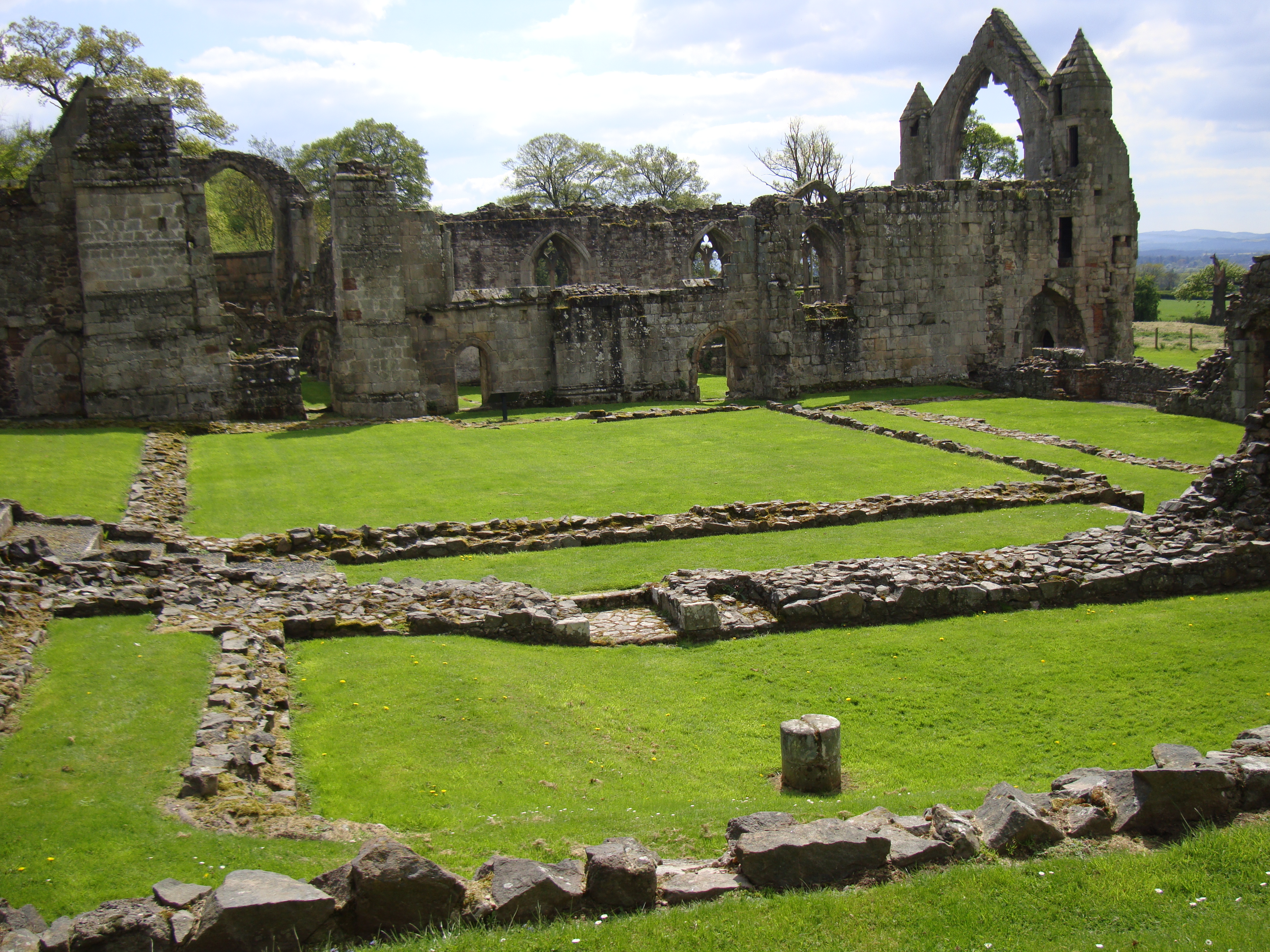
Remains of Haughmond Abbey

Haughmond Abbey (locally /ˈhoʊmənd/ HOE-mənd) is a ruined, medieval, Augustinian monastery a few miles from Shrewsbury, England. It was probably founded in the early 12th century and was closely associated with the FitzAlan family, who became Earls of Arundel, and some of their wealthier vassals and allies. It was a substantial, successful and wealthy house for most of its four centuries, although evidence of abuses appeared before its dissolution in 1539. The buildings fell into disrepair and the church was largely destroyed, although the remains of some of the domestic buildings remain impressive. The site is now in the care of English Heritage and is open to the public throughout the year and free entry. There is a small Visitor Centre on site with an interesting exhibition of the Abbey. The visitor centre is opened and staffed by a team of volunteers daily between 11am and 3pm (times and opening may vary due to volunteer availability). The site is open from 10am until 6pm (Apr-Oct) and 10am until 4pm (Nov-Mar).

== Origins ==
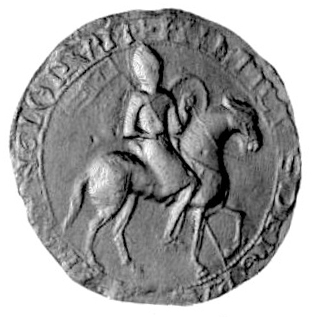
Seal of Henry I, showing the king on horseback. Alan FitzFlaad, founder of the FitzAlan family, seems to have made his fortune as part of Henry's military retinue.

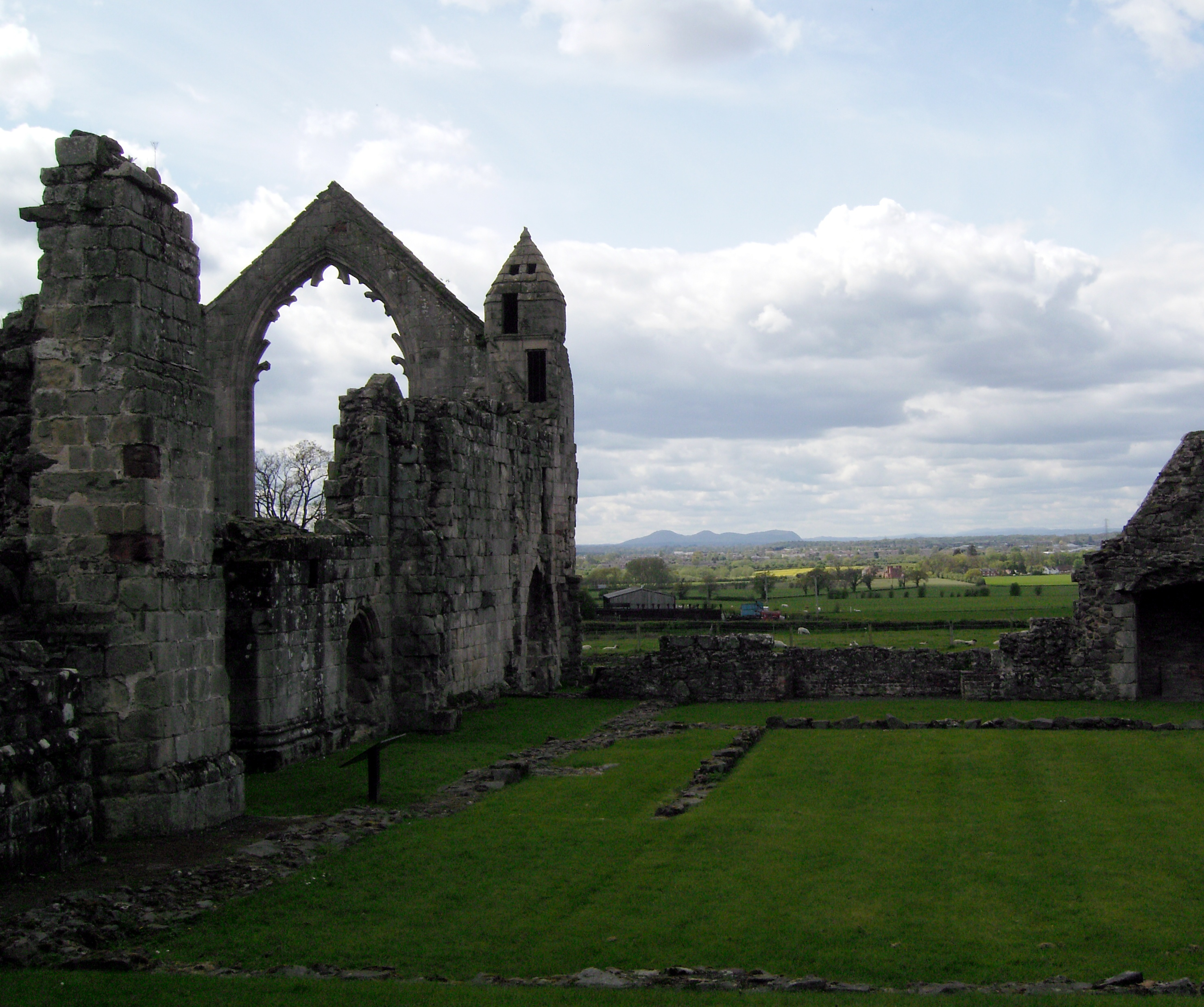
Breidden and Middletown Hills seen across the little cloister.

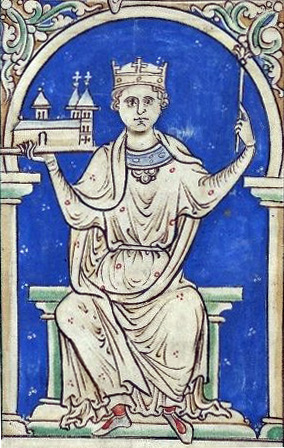
King Stephen, who reigned 1135–1154. The civil wars of his reign were the context for the abbey's establishment. Although it was distinctively an Angevin house, he confirmed some of its early endowments.

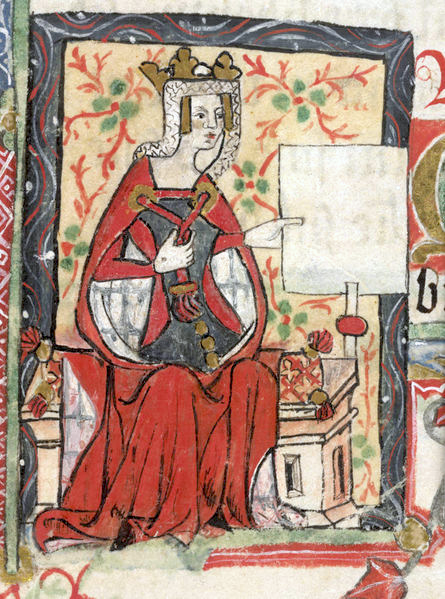
Empress Matilda, Stephen's rival for the throne, depicted holding a charter. William FitzAlan endured two decades of exile in her cause. She and her son, Henry II, were important benefactors to the abbey.

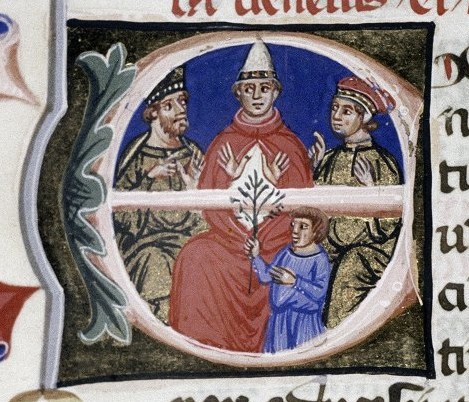
Pope Alexander III, flanked by the Emperor Frederick Barbarossa and the Emperor's wife, pictured within a letter E, as part of a manuscript illumination.

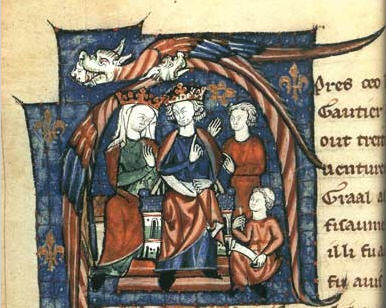
Henry II and his wife, Eleanor of Aquitaine. He gave land at Leebotwood and granted the right to make assarts around the abbey site – both strategically important for the abbey's later prosperity.

The cartulary of the abbey begins with a statement of its foundation story, as understood at the time it was written down, probably in the Late Middle Ages

Fundata est Abbathia de Haghmon anno domini millesimo centesimo et in anno ultimo regni Regis Willielmi Rufi et anno regni Regis Henrici primi primo, per Willielmum filium Alani, ut patet in pluribus, et specialiter in duobus Bullis sub plumbo Alexandri Papae Tercii vocantis eum Fundatorem predicti loci.

Translation:

Haughmond Abbey was founded in AD 1100, the last year of the reign of King William Rufus and the first year of the reign of King Henry I, by William FitzAlan, as disclosed by many things, and especially in two papal bulls of Pope Alexander III designating him the founder of the aforementioned place.

R. W. Eyton, the assiduous Victorian historian of Shropshire, critically considered the cartulary evidence in his 1856 study of the Haughmond's origins, pointing out that it was impossible for all the facts asserted to be true, as William FitzAlan is known to have been still a youth in 1138, when he became involved in the Anarchy of Stephen's reign. Moreover, of the two bulls concerning the abbey issued by Alexander III in 1172, one does not mention the foundation at all, while the other does attribute it to William FitzAlan but does not give a date. Around the time of the dissolution, the traveller and antiquary Leland repeated the cartulary's story of the foundation, with the slight variation of placing the date in 1101. A 13th century chronicle, written locally, gives the date as 1110. Eyton seized upon the earliest charter in the cartulary as giving a fairly secure date. In it, William FitzAlan grants to the community a fishery at Preston Boats, a member of the manor of Upton Magna, about 3 km south of the abbey on the River Severn – the first clear indication that the community existed. FitzAlan's grant names the leader of the community as Prior Fulk. Augustinian communities were generally counted as priories, although large, entirely independent houses were called abbeys. The grant also mentions that the monastery was dedicated to Saint John the Evangelist and this was to persist throughout its history: a statue of St John with his emblem can be found carved into the arches of the chapter house and his image also appeared on the abbey's great seal. The witnesses were William FitzAlan's wife, Christiana, and his brother, Walter. The grant seems to date from the years around 1135, when Henry I died and a power contest broke out between Stephen and Empress Matilda.

However, it is not certain that William FitzAlan founded or was the first to endow the community. Leland repeats the persistent story that "there was an hermitage and a chapell before the erectynge of the abbey". This suggests some value in considering the founding of the FitzAlan fortunes by William FitzAlan's father, Alan fitz Flaad. He appeared in Henry I's company at least as early as September 1101, when he witnessed important grants to Norwich Cathedral. Thereafter, he is heard of with the king at Canterbury in 1103, in the New Forest in 1104, He seems to have taken an interest in donations of his own to religious houses, as at some point he gave a manor to Norwich Cathedral, a gift the king promised "to confirm when Alan comes to my court" – evidently a regular occurrence. Only later does he appear as a witness to an order given to Richard de Belmeis I, the Bishop of London and the king's viceroy in Shropshire, to deal with a disputed prebend at Morville, presumably a complication of the abolition of the collegiate church there in favour of Shrewsbury Abbey. Alan appears in this context among a group of Shropshire magnates, including Corbets and a Peverel, probably during Henry I's 1114 military expedition into Wales. It seems to have been around this time that he acquired the abbey site, along with other large estates in Shropshire and Sussex. The estates had been granted by William the Conqueror to Rainald de Bailleul, the Sheriff of Shropshire, in consideration of his shrievalty, and were given to Alan after the death of Rainald's son, Hugh. One of the most important was Upton Magna, in which Haughmond Abbey was located. Eyton places the handover earlier, around the time of a royal expedition to Shropshire in 1109. It is possible that Alan was the founder of the original priory, or even that it began before his time, as a small eremitic community, towards the end of the 11th century. Another possibility is that the community was established or nurtured by Alan's widow, variously named as Adelina, Avelina or Evelyn, who seems to have survived him by many years.

Despite his reservations about the self-contradictory sources, Eyton concluded that the foundation date lay between 1130 and 1138 and that the founder of the abbey "in all respects was the first William Fitz-Alan". However, William FitzAlan's grant of the Preston Boats fish weir, around 1135, was clearly not a foundation grant: there was already a small but growing community when it was made. The Victoria County History account tends to give more weight than Eyton to the possibility of an earlier origin. Augustinian communities often began as small gatherings around a noted hermit before growing into established monasteries, or even small religious orders: the Abbey of Arrouaise in northern France, which had a Shropshire community at nearby Lilleshall Abbey, is an example. At Haughmond, the remains of a very modest early church were discovered beneath the floor of the later, more ambitious building, during the 1907 excavations: this may date back to the time of Prior Fulk or earlier. Despite these reservations and qualifications, the most recent account of William Fitz-Alan, in the Oxford Dictionary of National Biography, simply treats him as the founder of the abbey, and it was certainly he who placed it on a secure basis, even if he was not the originator.

== Early growth and confirmations ==
William FitzAlan took the side of the Empress and was exiled from the region from 1138 until at least 1153. However, endowments continued in FitzAlan's absence. The Empress gave Haughmond land and a mill in Walcot, Shropshire. The land grant at least is generally thought to date from Matilda's time at Oxford in the summer of 1141, when she temporarily had the upper hand in the civil war. The abbey took the precaution of getting Stephen's approval for these valuable gifts – assuming that Stephen's grant of the same property actually was later, which is not absolutely certain. When Henry, Duke of Normandy, the future Henry II, appeared in England in 1153, he was induced to issue a charter at Leicester, confirming his mother's grants. This strategy of obtaining triple grants during the Anarchy was followed also by Lilleshall Abbey.

An early benefactor of Haughmond was Ranulf de Gernon, 4th Earl of Chester, who donated the right to fish in the Dee and take 6000 salt fish free of tolls. Ranulf brought a number of Welsh magnates into the civil war, initially on the Angevin side. This brought gifts of some Welsh churches to the abbey, including that at Trefeglwys, in Arwystli, and at that at Nefyn, which was donated by Cadwaladr ap Gruffydd. In 1155, the year after Henry II took the throne, his supporter, William FitzAlan, finally regained his Shropshire estates. William then donated the church at Wroxeter to Haughmond. This was a portionary church – staffed by a number of canons, dividing the income, but not forming a structured college. FitzAlan stipulated that the abbot must maintain five secular clergy at Wroxeter and send five canons to participate in the celebration of the feasts of St Andrew, St George, and St Denis. He also declared he would increase the number of canons at Wroxeter, thus benefiting Wroxeter and Haughmond simultaneously. He declared this was "so that they might have a full convent", implying that he intended the church to evolve into a college, probably as a family chantry. If that was his intention, it never materialised. Notably, the donation refers to Abbas de Haghmon, the Abbot of Haughmond, indicating that the house had grown in size and status.

As the wealth of the abbey increased, the rebuilding of the church and abbey was begun. Over the next twenty years it was constructed in a late Romanesque style, funded mainly by the FitzAlans and their vassals, especially the Lestrange family. However, there were royal donations, including assarts around the abbey site, which were granted by an early charter of Henry II. These signalled that the abbey was closely associated politically with the Angevin dynasty. This was reinforced by the appointment of Alured, the king's former tutor, as abbot, probably in the 1160s. It was Alured who in 1172 obtained two bulls from Pope Alexander III, confirming the early grants, giving the abbey extra-parochial status, including the right to bury whoever willed it, and conferring on the canons the right to elect their own abbot. The king added still more charters when he was at Shrewsbury later in his reign, probably in 1176, updating the list of endowments conferred upon the abbey by that time.

== Endowments and benefactors ==
The following is a list of notable properties donated to Haughmond Abbey in its first century, based on the account of the abbey in the Victoria County History.

Location	Donor	Nature of grant	Approximate coordinates
Preston Boats	William FitzAlan	Fishery in River Severn	52°42′12″N 2°42′32″W
Haughmond	William FitzAlan	Abbey site	52°43′57″N 2°40′48″W
Sheriffhales, Shropshire	William FitzAlan	Land	52°42′29″N 2°21′23″W
Peppering, near Arundel, Sussex	William FitzAlan	Land	50°52′26″N 0°31′39″W
Walcot, Shropshire	Empress Matilda, confirmed by Stephen and Henry II	Land and mill	52°42′19″N 2°36′17″W
River Dee	Ranulf de Gernon, 4th Earl of Chester	Fishing rights	53°11′10″N 2°53′16″W
Trefeglwys		Church of St Michael	52°30′13″N 3°31′06″W
Nefyn	Cadwaladr ap Gruffydd	Church of St Mary	52°56′11″N 4°31′05″W
Wroxeter	William FitzAlan	St Andrew's Church, Wroxeter	52°40′07″N 2°38′43″W
Cheswardine	John Lestrange (Latin: Johannes Extraneus)	Mill and Church of St Swithun	52°51′54″N 2°24′58″W
Shawbury	Robert FitzNigel	Church of St Mary	52°47′11″N 2°39′18″W
North Stoke, West Sussex	William FitzAlan	St Mary the Virgin's Church, North Stoke	50°53′15″N 0°33′05″W
Leebotwood, Shropshire	Henry II	Land	52°34′56″N 2°46′26″W
Betchcott, Shropshire	Henry II	Land	52°34′59″N 2°50′02″W
Downton, Shropshire	William FitzAlan	Lordship	52°42′42″N 2°40′40″W
Upton Magna, Shropshire	William FitzAlan	Land and mill	52°42′30″N 2°39′39″W
Nantwich, Cheshire	William FitzAlan	Half of a salt evaporation pond	53°04′01″N 2°31′19″W
Berrington, Shropshire	John Lestrange	Land	52°39′28″N 2°41′55″W
Webscott, near Myddle, Shropshire	John Lestrange	Land	52°47′59″N 2°46′53″W
Ruyton-XI-Towns, Shropshire	John Lestrange	Mill and church	52°47′42″N 2°53′53″W
Myddle, Shropshire	John Lestrange	Mill	52°48′37″N 2°47′19″W
Nagington, Child's Ercall, Shropshire	Hamo Lestrange	Landed estate	52°49′29″N 2°28′47″W
Alveley, Shropshire	Guy Lestrange	Mill	52°27′32″N 2°20′59″W
Wolston, Warwickshire	Guy Lestrange	Mill	52°22′46″N 1°23′59″W
Hopley, near Hodnet, Shropshire	Osbert of Hopton and Helias de Say	Landed estate	52°50′15″N 2°36′07″W
Hopton, near Hodnet	Osbert of Hopton and Helias de Say	Half virgate of land	52°50′53″N 2°35′58″W
Hadnall, Shropshire	Gilbert de Hadnall	Land	52°46′36″N 2°42′33″W
Hardwick, Shropshire		Land	52°30′32″N 2°55′57″W
Sundorne, Shropshire	Alan FitzOliver	Landed estate	52°43′54″N 2°43′17″W
Uffington, Shropshire	Richard de la Mare	Land	52°43′12″N 2°41′59″W
Withington, Shropshire	Roger FitzHenry	Land	52°42′50″N 2°37′39″W
Grinshill, Shropshire	Adam de Orleton and successors	Land and later lordship, acquired by agreement with Wombridge Priory	52°48′23″N 2°42′44″W
Stockett by Ellesmere, Shropshire	Dafydd ab Owain Gwynedd	Landed estate	52°52′16″N 2°50′52″W
Newton by Ellesmere, Shropshire	Geoffrey de Vere and Robert FitzAer	Land	52°54′14″N 2°51′43″W
Beobridge, Shropshire	Emma, daughter of Reynold of Pulverbatch	Land	52°31′25″N 2°18′20″W
Aston Abbots, Shropshire	Amelia de Sibton and others	Land	52°50′20″N 3°00′10″W

Churches formed a significant part of the abbey's wealth. Through appropriation, the abbey corporately took on the role of rector in the parish and thus received the tithes. It retained advowson of the church and any chapels, allowing it to appoint the vicars and curates; this would generate a substantial entry fine on each appointment. Churches provided a steady stream of income, with little cost and effort. Haughmond appropriated the churches listed above in the 12th century: Stoke, Shawbury (including its dependent chapels), Cheswardine, Ruyton XI Towns, Nefyn and Treseglwys. In addition it later appropriated the following churches:

Location of Church	Dedication	Coordinates
Old Hunstanton	St Mary	52°56′55″N 0°30′45″E
Stokesay	John the Baptist	52°25′51″N 2°49′52″W
Hanmer	St Chad	52°57′08″N 2°48′48″W
Stanton upon Hine Heath	St Andrew	52°48′36″N 2°38′32″W

The distribution maps available above show that the abbey's assets were heavily concentrated, tending to form natural groups, in Shropshire. This was a major advantage that Haughmond had over nearby Lilleshall, which always suffered from the running costs associated with a widely dispersed property portfolio. The acquisition policy of the abbey tended to strengthen this advantage, deliberately buying or requesting grants of adjoining estates to increase local concentrations of land. Beyond Leebotwood, for example, the abbey built up a large composite of holdings. A grant by Henry II of meadow on the Long Mynd marked the beginning of the venture. More benefactors contributed, especially the powerful Robert Corbet of Caus Castle, and a substantial monastic estate took shape, known as the "domain of Boveria”, from the Latin bos/bovis, an ox, and meaning roughly "cattle shed". This land along the Wales–England border, was mostly waste when the canons arrived but quickly became excellent pasture, as the new name suggests. It fell in the Diocese of Hereford and it was Bishop Robert Foliot who gave the canons permission to turn their oratory at Stitt, in Ratlinghope manor, into church for the region. After it acquired Aston Abbots, in the early 13th century, the community built up another large group of holdings east of Oswestry at Hisland, Twyford and West Felton, and Great Ness. Wherever estates adjoined uncultivated areas, the community took to vigorous assarting. This had been specifically allowed by Henry II in some of his grants. To make administration easier, the estates were divided into 12 local bailiwicks. These were generally under lay management, but obedientiaries, canons with specific responsibilities for rent and tithe collection, were deputed by the abbots to keep in touch.

In addition to land and churches, the abbey increasingly exploited mills, which increased in number over the centuries. As Dissolution approached in 1538, profits from the abbey's 21 grain and 5 fulling mills amounted to about 8% of its total income.

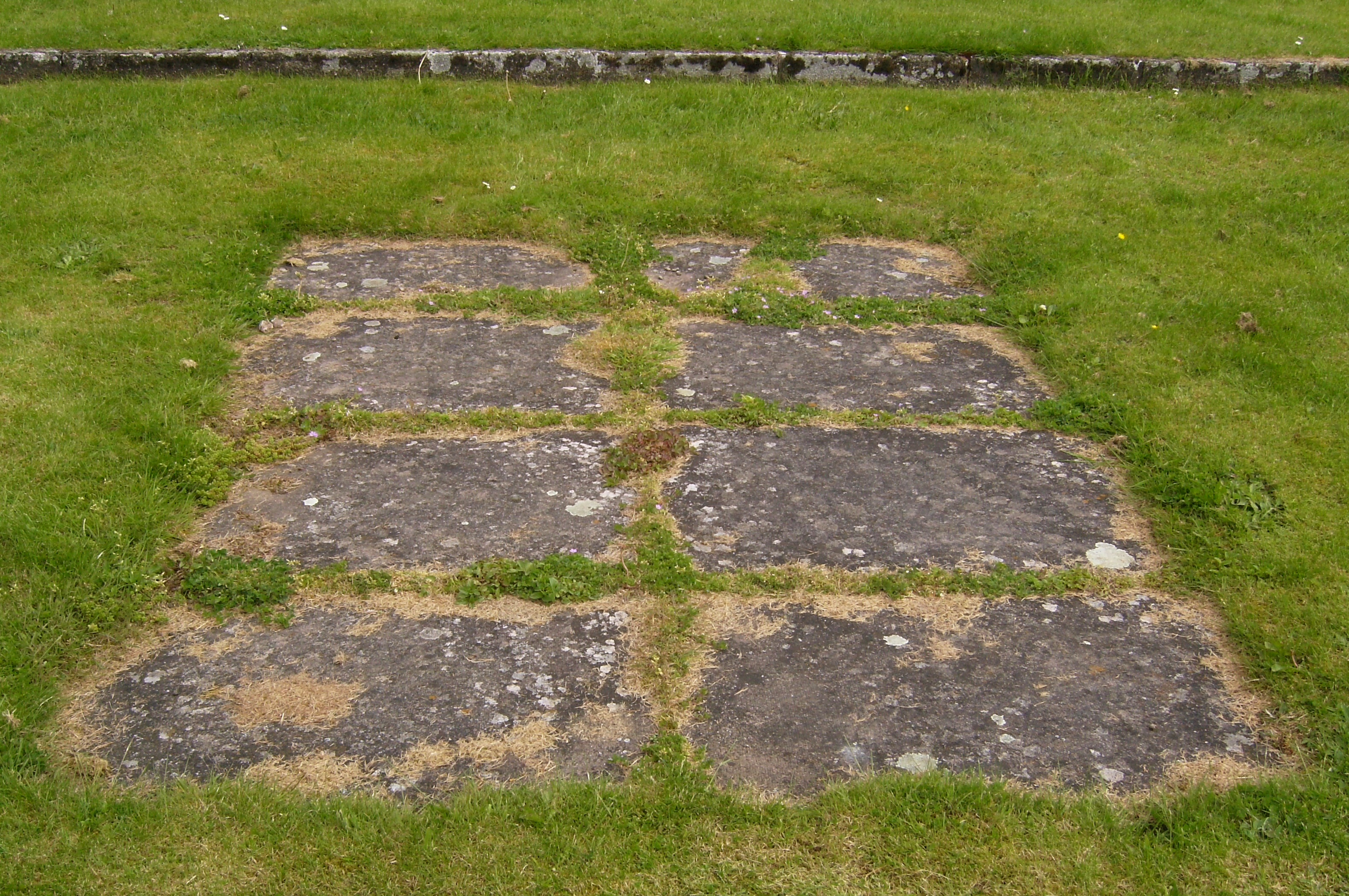
Graves of Richard Fitzalan, 8th Earl of Arundel (died 1302) and his mother, Isabella Mortimer, Countess of Arundel (died circa 1292), who were buried in the sanctuary.

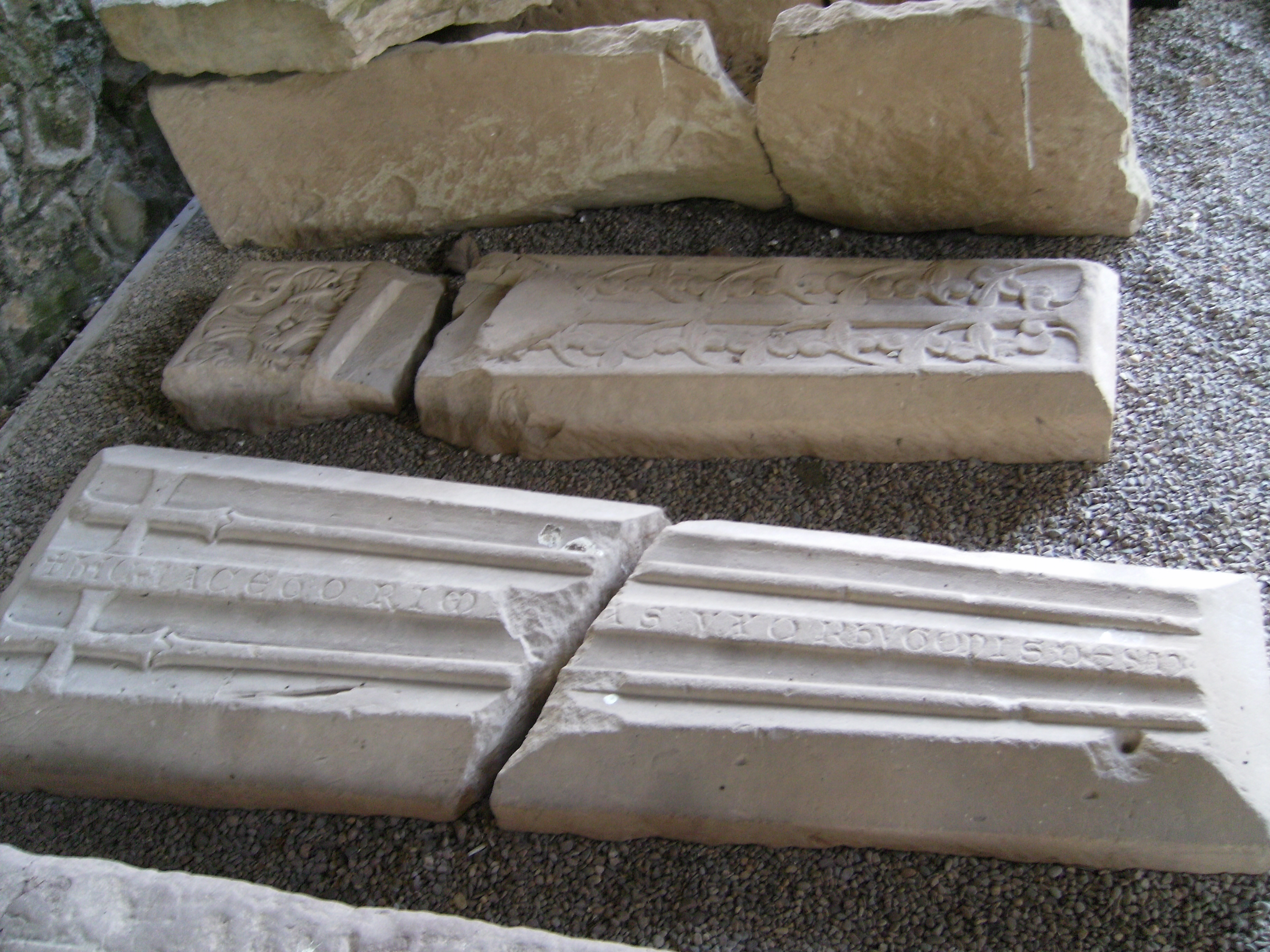
Gravestones in chapter house. The broken stone in centre is of Olimpia de Say.

The concentration of property reflected the circumstances of the abbey's foundation by a powerful territorial dynasty that maintained its interest in the Marches for at least two centuries. As William FitzAlan was always recognised as founder, a Henry II's charter of about 1176 gave his successors custody of the abbey whenever the position of abbot was vacant. The first William FitzAlan was buried in Shrewsbury Abbey, but subsequent heads of the family were buried at Haughmond for over 150 years. Even after the FitzAlans acquired the prestigious earldom of Arundel in 1243, they continued to regard the abbey as theirs and to call the canons canonici mei. When Edmund FitzAlan, 9th Earl of Arundel was executed at Hereford in 1326, his body was buried there, despite his wish to be buried at Haughmond. Abbot Nicholas of Longnor protested and was able to have the body transferred to Haughmond.

Elias or Helias de Say was an important early benefactor, giving lands around Hodnet. His daughter, Isabella, was William FitzAlan's second wife. The male line of the Clun de Says ended with Elias and Isabella passed the estates to the family of her second husband, Geoffrey de Vere, son of Aubrey de Vere I, Earl of Oxford. However, there was another branch of the family at Stokesay, to which they gave their name. The tombstone of a later family member, Olimpia de Say, is now displayed in the chapter house, having been discovered in the Cloister.

The FitzAlans also motivated their vassals and allies to follow their example in making grants. This was especially so of the Lestranges, and most especially of the Knockin branch of the family. Their interest and protection continued down the centuries, with repeated grants of land and loans. In 1342 Roger Lestrange, Baron Strange of Knockin, granted the church at Hanmer to fund a perpetual chantry at the abbey, although it was not until about 1426 that practical and legal difficulties were overcome to establish the chantry.

== Ranton Priory and other dependencies ==
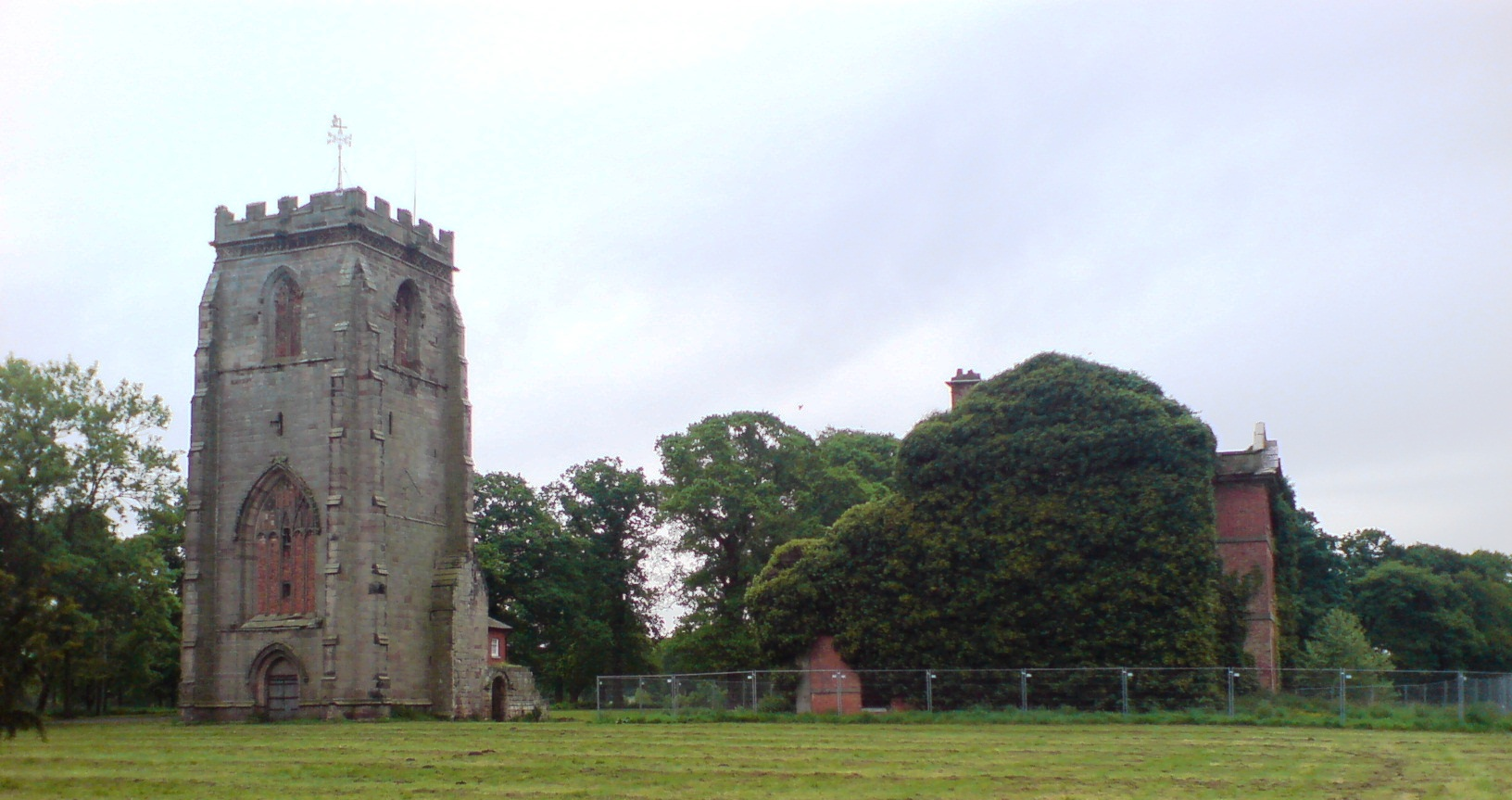
The tower of Ranton Priory church, all that remains of the priory.

Ranton Priory in Staffordshire, founded in the mid-12th century by Robert Fitz-Noel and dedicated to the Virgin Mary, was the only monastery institutionally dependent on Haughmond for a time. Its foundation charter states that it is sub regula & obedientia Hamanensis Ecclesiae – under the rule of the church of Haughmond – and the confirmation by Archbishop Baldwin of Forde (1184–90) reaffirmed that it followed the rule of Haughmond. It is possible that there was friction, as a charter from Archbishop Hubert Walter (1193-1205) seems very assertive in insisting that Ranton owes "obedience and subjection" to Haughmond. Relations seem to have been regulated by undated but probably later document, described as amicabilis compositio – a friendly agreement – between the two houses. This stated that the abbot was to visit Ranton at least annually. It gave the canons of Ranton full voting rights in elections for the abbot, although in elections for their own prior, they were to choose a canon from Ranton and another from Haughmond, with the abbot having the final say. They were free to regulate the membership of the priory, so long as all canons pledged obedience to the abbot.

At some point, probably in the late 12th century, for reasons unknown, the dependence of the priory on Haughmond was challenged by Great Bricett Priory in Suffolk, which sued for recognition as the mother house. Bricett also demanded that Haughmond give up its control of Wombridge Priory, which was still less explicable, as it had no control at all over Wombridge. Haughmond eventually got Bricett to drop its suit for a single payment of 40 shillings. However, the underlying tension resurfaced between Ranton, a fairly large house to be considered merely a cell, and Haughmond. After an appeal to the papacy, an enquiry set up by Bishop Roger Weseham gave Ranton full independence, although it was required to pay an annual pension of 100 shillings to Haughmond.

Although not dependent on Haughmond, there were other institutions under its spiritual influence. The canons of Owston Abbey in Leicestershire were ordered by its founder, Robert Grimbald, to live "according to the order of the church of Haughmond". As Haughmond seems to have been an entirely normal Augustinian house, this must mean following its example in rigorously pursuing the Augustinian rule.

It seems also that Haughmond was intended to provide a chantry service at St John's Hospital in Oswestry, which was founded by Reiner, Bishop of St Asaph (1186-1224). In return it was to receive the manor of Wilcot. It is unclear whether this arrangement was ever implemented before Reiner also gave control over the hospital to the Knights Hospitaller. This led a series of legal proceedings involving Haughmond and the Hospitallers. Ultimately Haughmond agreed to hold the hospital of the Hospitallers for a payment of 20 shillings annually to their Preceptory at Halston.

== The monastic life ==
The Augustinian rule allowed for many different styles of religious life. Haughmond was certainly a community of Canons Regular but only a little is known about the precise interpretation of the rule that prevailed or how well it was followed. Generally, a financially solvent house was likely to have a better religious life, and Haughmond was generally well run. After the mid-14th century there were never more than 13 canons, although the size of the buildings suggests numbers were considerably greater in earlier centuries.

The chronicler Gervase of Canterbury noted that the Augustinians of Haughmond were Canonici Albi, that is, white canons. The so-called white habit was probably simply of undyed wool and may reinforce suggestions that Haughmond was an independent eremitic community before it was absorbed, with all such groups, into the Augustinian order. A local chronicle notes that Haughmond adopted the typical Augustinian black habit in 1234.

Augustinians were expected to observe strict protocols in contacts with outsiders, to travel only with their abbot's permission and never to sleep alone. One of the problems at Lilleshall was that canons were often forced to undertake expeditions to the outlying estates, outside direct supervision of the abbot. This was much less prevalent at Haughmond, with its more concentrated estates, although it seems there was sometimes a need for canons to stay at Nefyn, where there was a canons' house in the early 14th century. There were also facilities, including chapels, for canons and abbots to stay on some of the granges, including Leebotwood and Beobridge. As the canons were all ordained priests, they could also officiate at chapels in the extra-parochial areas to the west, although secular clergy were appointed as soon as these communities became viable. Eyton traced in detail how the chapel at Knockin evolved, under the abbey's control, into a parish church with a vicar. In the early years there were lay brothers to help in the work of the abbey, but they are never mentioned after 1190. There were, however, numerous paid officials and servants on the premises.

Arrangements for food and clothing altered over the years. Initially, canons were granted an annual allowance for clothing. In 1315, the Bishop of Lichfield, Walter Langton, prohibited this practice, so Abbot Richard de Brock earmarked the revenues of Cheswardine church and of Nagington and Hisland to be given to a chamberlain, who was to arrange supplies of clothing.

The diet at Haughmond seems to have been relatively varied and less austere than in most monastic institutions. In 1280 147 sheep and a calf were supplied to the abbey. Tithes of sea fish were exacted at Nefyn and the abbey had fisheries on the Dee and Severn, but it seems unlikely that fish were supplied fresh from the further fisheries. Ranulf of Chester's grant allowed the canons to purchase annually 6000 salted herrings. These were bought at Chester on special terms. In the 12th century the abbey was granted half a swarm of bees in the woods at Hardwick: it may be that mead was made, although honey had a symbolic connection with the austere life because of its association with John the Baptist, to whom the abbey was dedicated.

Diet seems to have been improved in the early 14th century by the same process of earmarking revenues to it. In 1332 Abbot Nicholas of Longnor, as part of a more general package of reforms, issued an ordinance on the abbey's culinary arrangements. This allocated the proceeds from the churches at Hunstanton and Ruyton XI Towns, together with those of the Dee and Severn fisheries, to the purchase of meat and fish. Longnor arranged for a new set of kitchens to be constructed:

Quod iidem prior et conventus habeant de caetero novam coquinam, pro refectorio assignatam, quam aedificari celeriter faciemus in qua parari faciant per coquum eorum specialem, cibaria eorum quae ad coquinam pertinent, de quibus ministrabitur eisdem, diebus singulis, per canonicos et ministros ad hoc per eos cum abbatis licentia deputandos.

Translation:

"That the prior and convent may have from henceforth, among other things, a new kitchen assigned for the frater, which we will cause to be built with all speed; in which they may cause to be prepared by their special cook such food as pertains to the kitchen of that which shall be served to them, every day, by the canons and ministers appointed to that end by them by leave of the abbot".

Fuel, flour, peas, cheese, butter, and pottage were still to be provided from the general accounts. Longnor also ordained a piggery:

Concedimus etiam pro nobis et successoribus nostris, quod omni tempore anni habeant in communi porcariam domus quae est extra portam, viginti porcos ad sumptus communes domus, pro eorum lardaria faciendo

Translation:

"We agree also for our ourself and our successors that at any time of the year they may have in common the piggery of the house which is without the gate, and twenty pigs at the common cost of the house, for furnishing their larder".

Two loads of flour were requisitioned annually for pastry. It is unclear to what extent the large quantities of meat actually formed part of the monastic diet, as there was also an infirmary on the premises and this must have absorbed some of the food supplies. The kitchener was ordered to render account to the abbot four times a year. A cellarer was responsible for the supply of both beer and bread, including that required at the abbey's granges. the abbot ate from the same kitchens as the canons and could feed guests free of charge when on the premises, but he, the steward and the chaplain were to feed themselves when away from the abbey. Abbot Longnor established a substantial garden at the abbey and in later centuries a dovecote was installed there, providing another convenient source of meat.

Sculptures of the saints at Haughmond Abbey

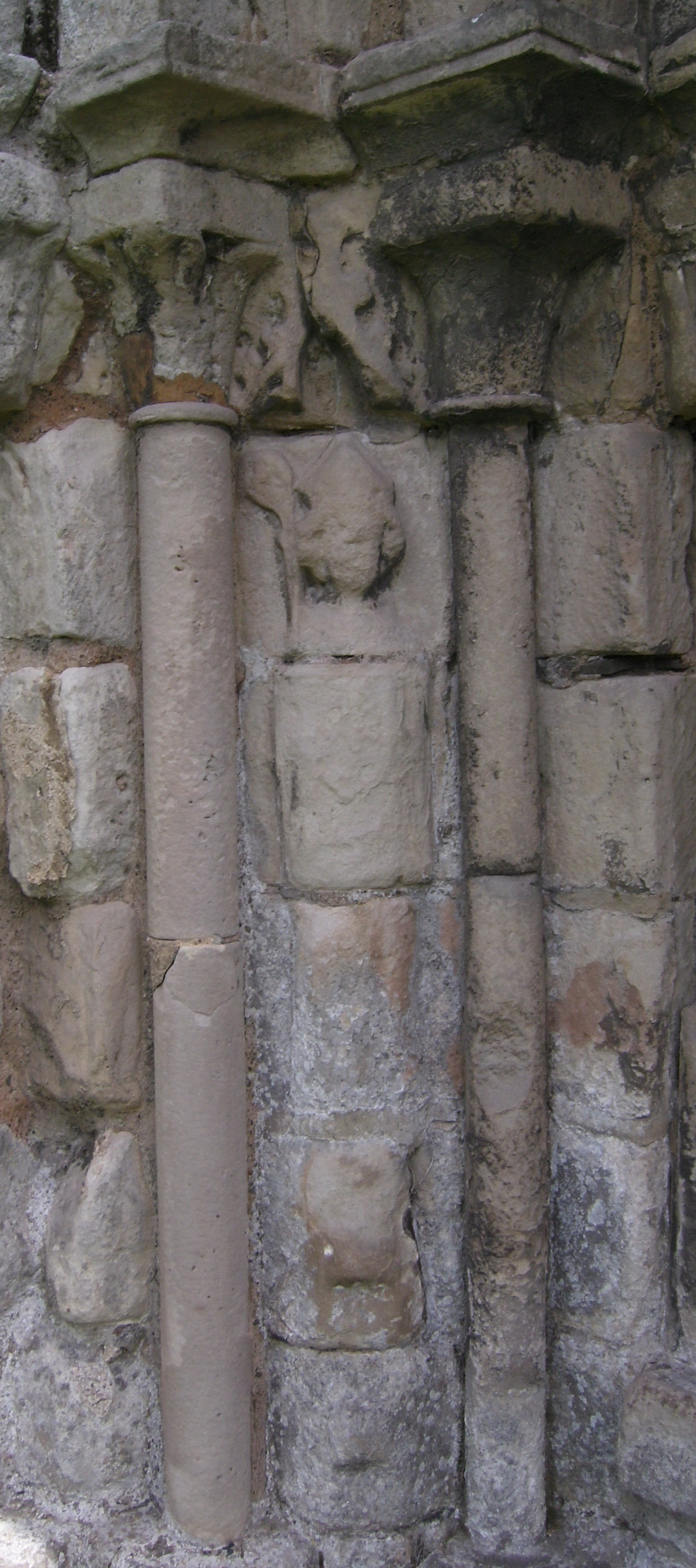
St Augustine of Hippo, eponym of the order.

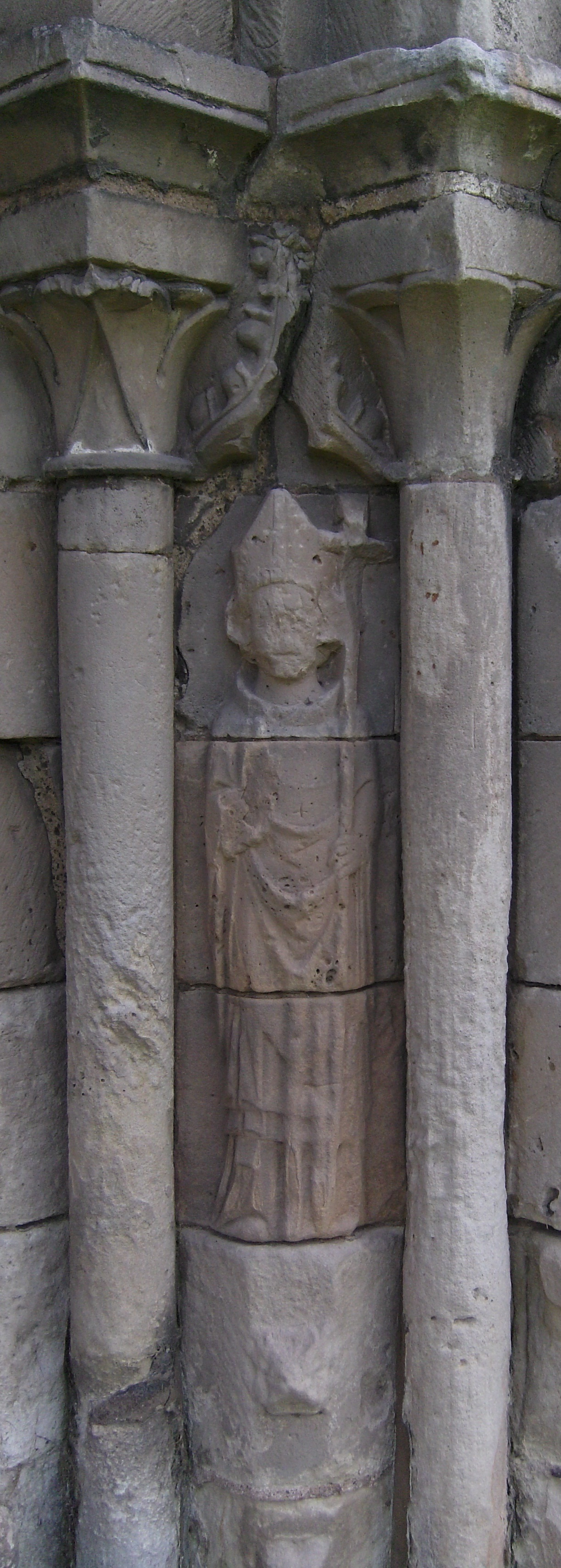
St Thomas of Canterbury, focus of England's most important pilgrimage.

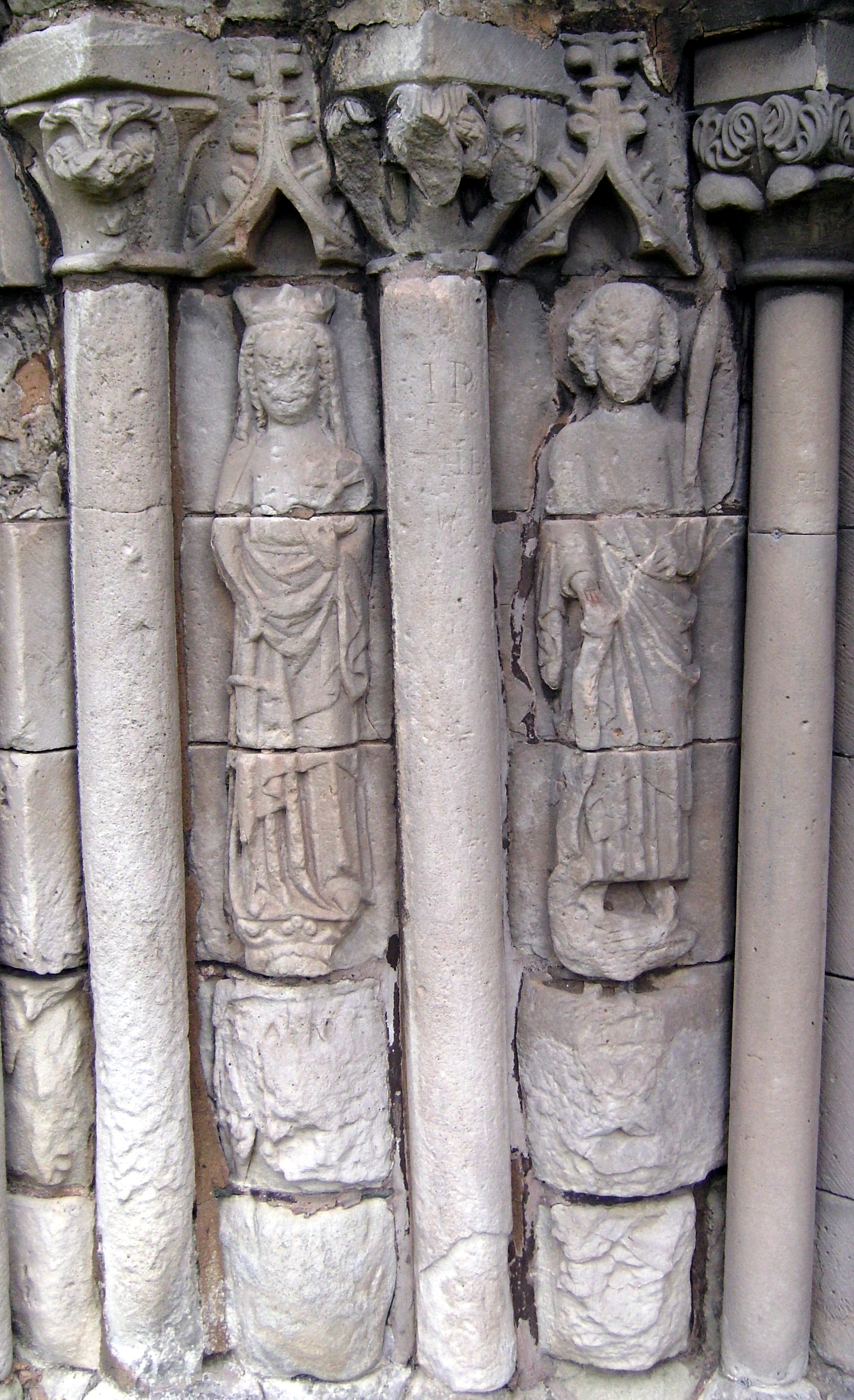
St Catherine of Alexandria, with her wheel of martyrdom, exacting revenge on Emperor Maxentius. St John the Evangelist with eagle emblem.

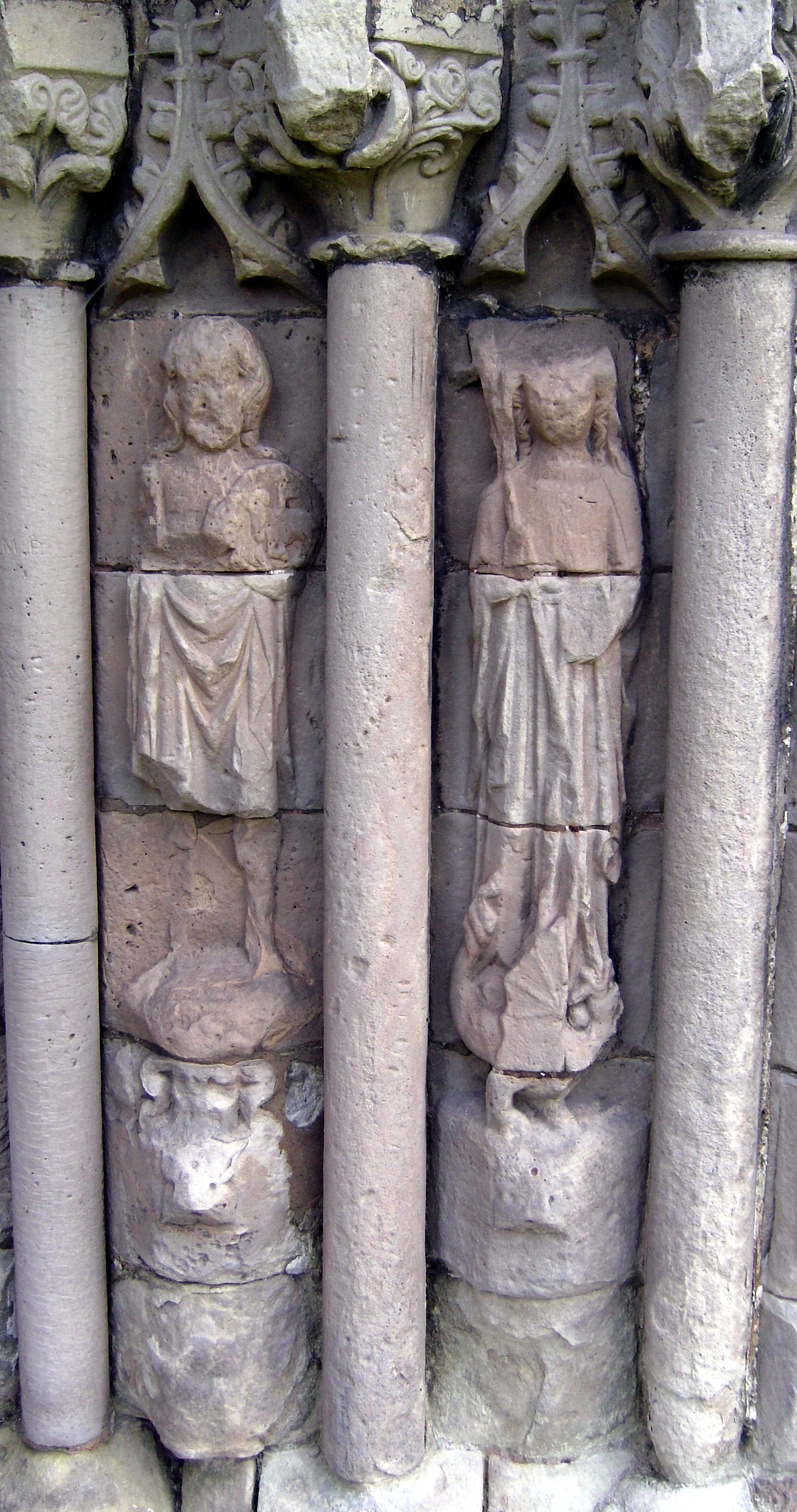
John the Baptist with lamb and flag. St Margaret of Antioch spearing a dragon.

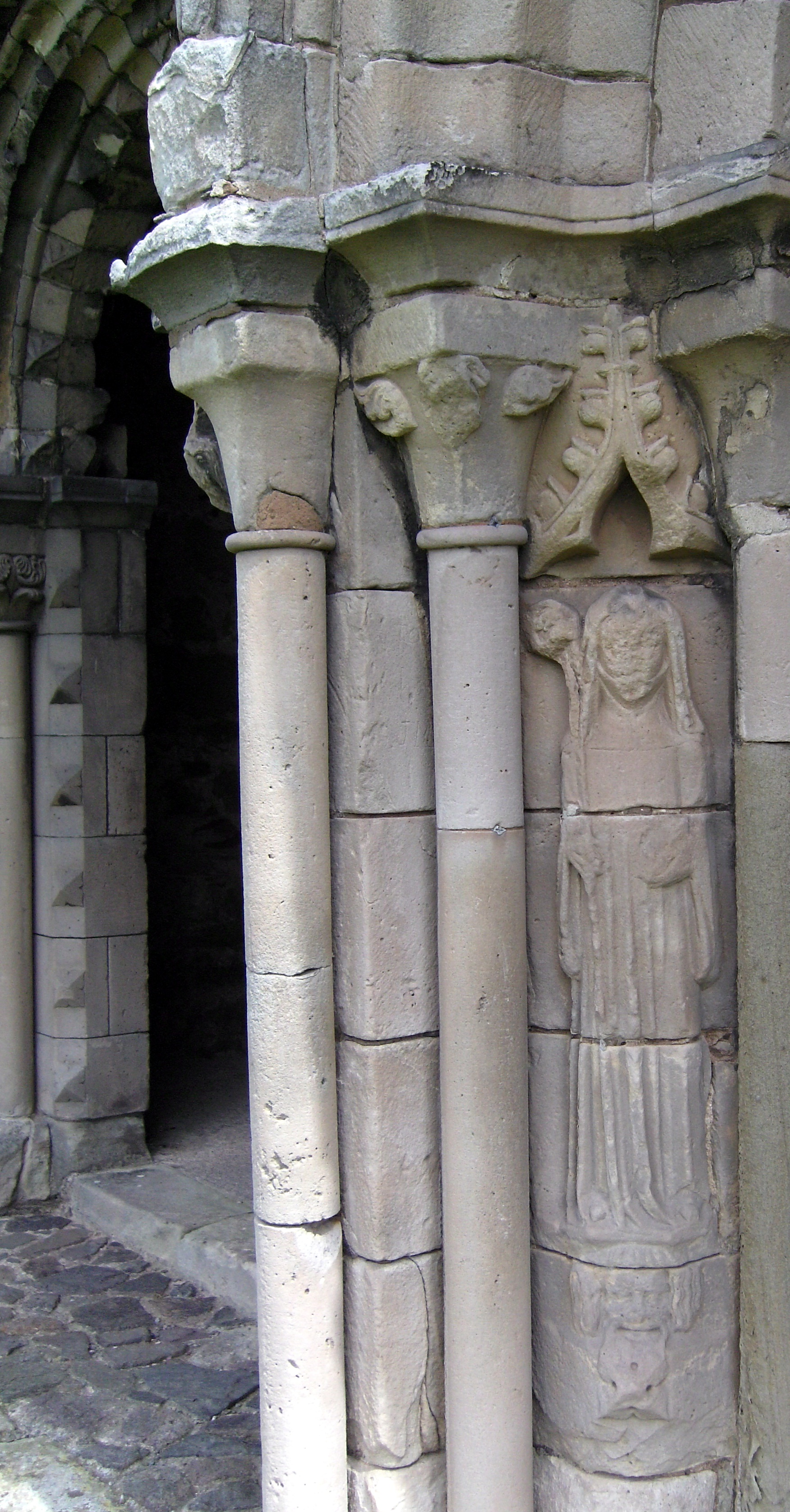
St Winifred with her murderer Caradog, who melted into the ground.

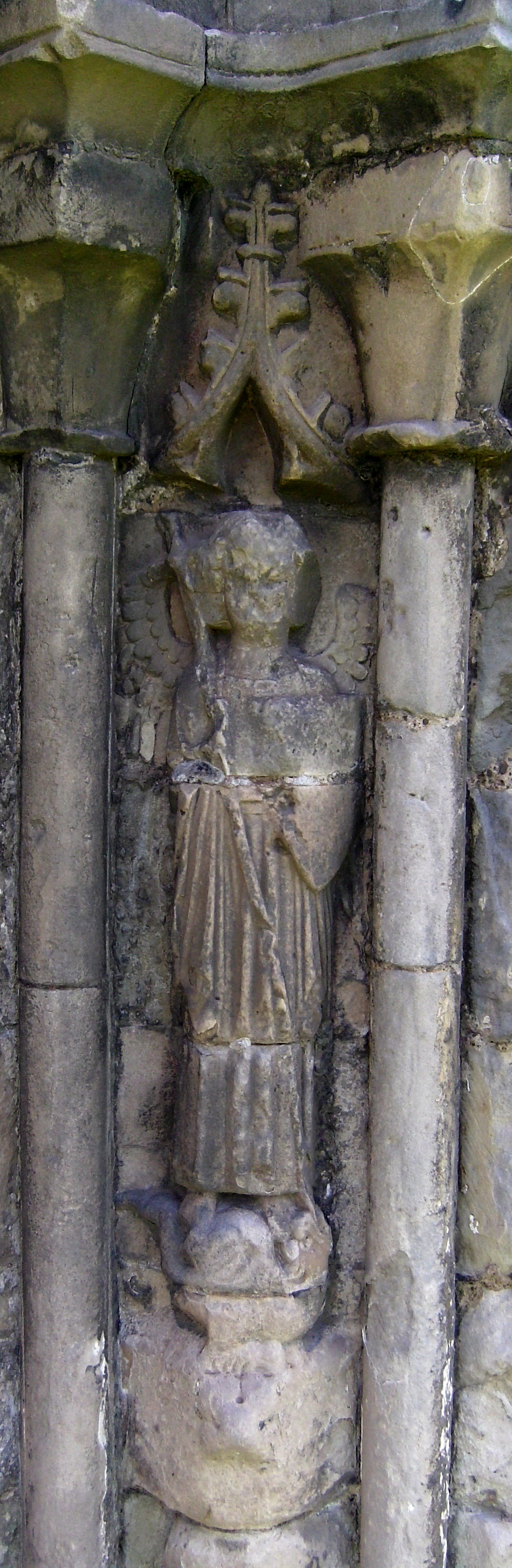
St Michael the Archangel slaying a dragon.

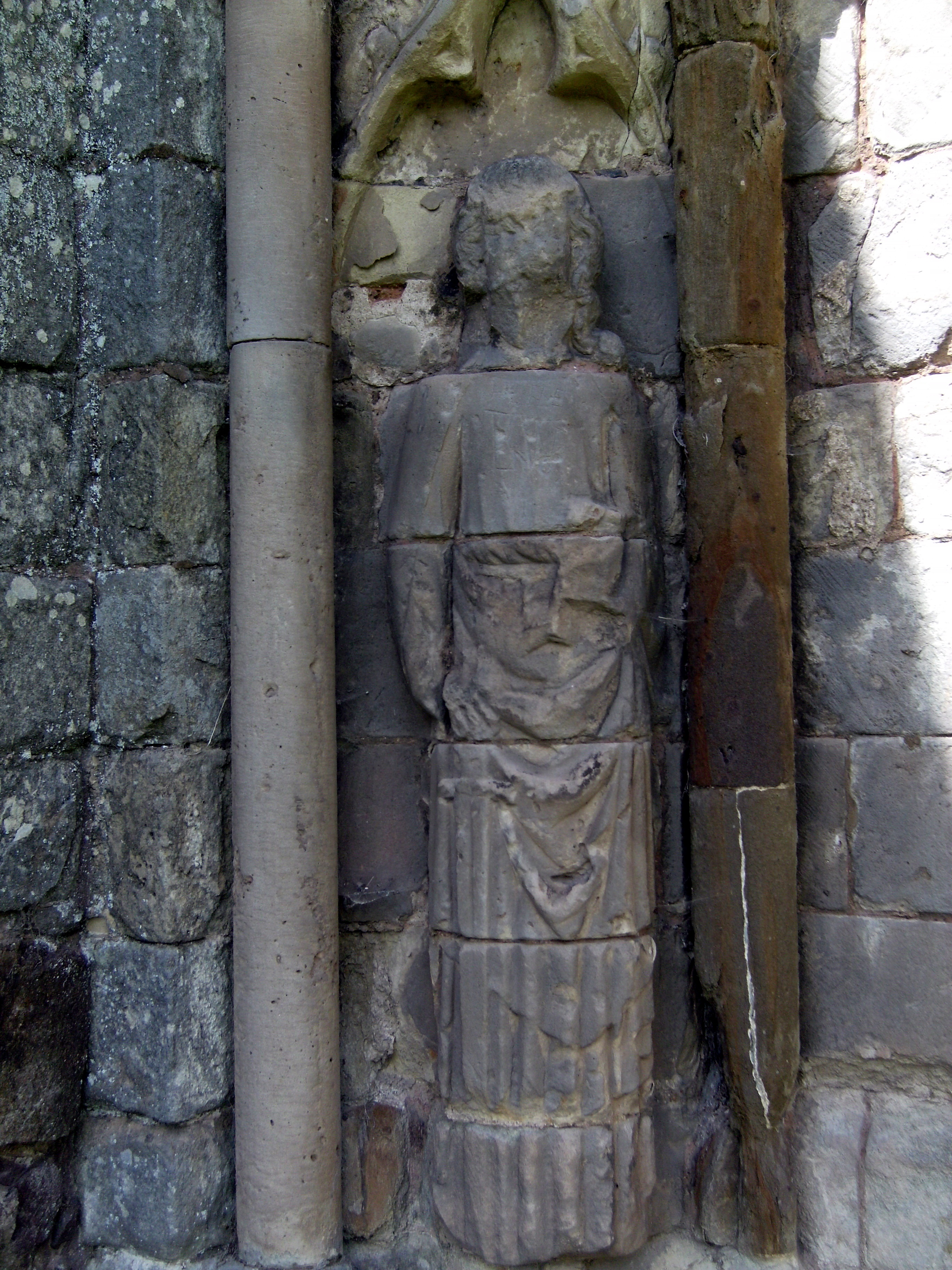
14th-century statue of St Peter on left of processional entrance.

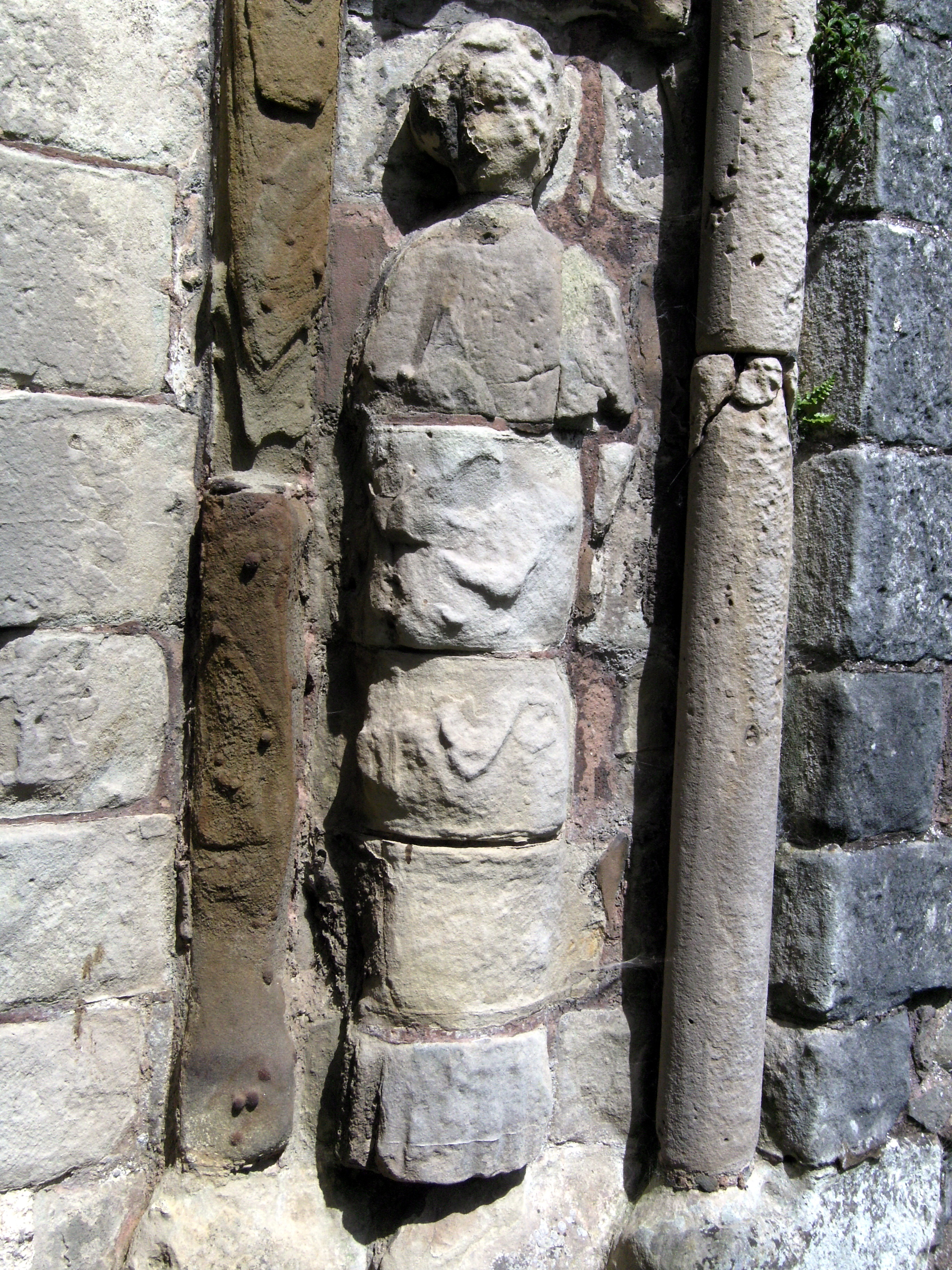
14th-century statue of St Paul on right of processional entrance.

In the absence of much documentary evidence, the abbey's art may shed some light on the values held dear by the community. In the 14th century a number of figures were carved on the previously plain shafts of the arches at the processional entrance to the church and at the entrance to the chapter house. St Peter and St Paul flank the church entrance used by the canons to enter the church for the Canonical Hours. These were the saints most closely associated with the Papacy, from which both the order and the abbey took their authority. For the chapter house, Augustine of Hippo, eponym of the order, and St John the Evangelist, patron saint of the abbey, were obvious choices. The remaining saints were all illustrative of martyrdom, austerity or spiritual struggle. Thomas Becket, murdered on the orders of Henry II, one of Haughmond's major benefactors, was a martyr whose cult at Canterbury was the focus for medieval England's most important pilgrimage. Catherine of Alexandria, seen as a virgin martyr, is portrayed with her wheel of martyrdom, taking revenge on the Emperor Maxentius. John the Baptist, closely associated with asceticism and speaking truth to power, and a Biblical type for Becket, clutches the lamb and flag symbol of the Agnus Dei. He is accompanied by Margaret of Antioch, who is spearing a dragon, a female counterpart to St Michael. St Winifred, a third virgin martyr, whose relics were kept at nearby Shrewsbury Abbey, is shown with her persecutor Caradog sinking into the ground. Facing her, St Michael the Archangel, armed with spear and shield, treads down and impales a dragon, representing Satan.

== Intellectual life ==
The abbey must have built up a collection of books large enough to need separate accommodation, as Abbot Richard Pontesbury complained in 1518 that the bybliotheca was in need of repair. A small number of the books have survived: a Bible; a volume of glossed Gospels; a work by Petrus Comestor, a French theologian; one by Hugh of Fouilloy, another French cleric; and a volume containing both the Sententiae of Isidore of Seville and De sapientia by Alcuin.

John Audelay was a noted 15th-century writer who resided at Haughmond. Audelay, a blind and deaf poet, was not an Augustinian canon but the first secular priest to serve in the Lestrange chantry. His accession date, 1426, is noted in a colophon of a manuscript of his work and he signs off several poems with a self-description: "My name is Jon the blynd Awdlay." It is known that Audelay had some involvement in disturbances at the church of St Dunstan-in-the-East in London at Easter 1417, in which his employer, Richard le Strange, 7th Baron Strange (1381–1449), and his entourage assaulted Sir John Trussell, on the second occasion killing a by-stander. Formerly regarded as little more than samples of the contemporary Shropshire Middle English dialect, Audelay's poems give considerable insight into the spiritual concerns of the age. Most reflect on the value of points of Christian doctrine or liturgy. His defence of the mass, for example, is clearly shaped by his own daily concerns as a chaplain. Pursuing his exposition, he brings in an example from the life of Augustine of Canterbury. The themes, which are strongly anti-Lollard, and the strategies of argument and exposition, are reminiscent of the work of his older contemporary, John Mirk, a canon of nearby Lilleshall. Like Mirk, Audelay seems very aware of the distinction between internal criticism, however trenchant, and heretical dissent. He drew a clear distinction between the work of conscientious priests and the conduct of worldly clerics. His strong emphasis on respect for the divine service may reflect his own sense of responsibility for the events of 1417. Occasionally he comments on topical concerns, as in a poem on Henry V's wooing of Catherine of Valois or another on the succession of Henry VI.

In the 15th century the abbey contributed to the upkeep of an Augustinian house of study at Oxford, which later became St Mary's College. The Holy Trinity Priory seems to have organised the collection of funds for the project, as it bound itself to repay 40 pounds sterling to Haughmond in the event of failure. However, Haughmond, like other Augustinian houses in the region, was not noted for its scholarship. The only Haughmond canon to achieve academic eminence was John Ludlow, who was a scholar at St Mary's, and headed it as prior studentium in 1453 and 1453: he became abbot of Haughmond in 1464. The abbey was supposed to maintain at least one canon at university but was fined 20 shillings in 1511 by the general chapter of the Augustinians for failing to do so.

== Difficulties and abuses ==
The abbey was subject to canonical visitation by the local ordinary, the Bishop of Lichfield. These were particularly zealous in the early 14th century, and criticised administrative and moral failings. For example, the obedientiaries who collected rents and tithes were instructed not to travel alone, and canons residing away from the abbey were ordered to be recalled. In 1354, the canons were criticised for their love of hunting. For most of the abbey's history, however, the criticisms were few and infrequent, and it is likely that monastic discipline was generally reasonably good. More serious criticisms came late in the history of the abbey, during the time of two abbots: Richard Pontesbury and Christopher Hunt.

Pontesbury was abbot from 1488 to about 1521. His failings seem to have been mainly in management both of resources and people, revealed in visitations in 1518 and 1521. Because revenues were being misapplied, the buildings were in need of repair, particularly the infirmary, dormitory, chapter house, and library. Pontesbury seems to have complained about this to the bishop as if he himself were not responsible. Liturgical life was suffering because of lack of instruction for the novices. Worse still, canons were visiting Shrewsbury, a woman of ill-repute was frequenting the abbey, and there were boys in the dormitory.

Pontesbury was replaced, but in 1522, his successor, Christopher Hunt, was accused of fornication, as well as incompetence and negligence. He admitted the fornication but claimed he had already performed penance. Nevertheless, he was sent to Lilleshall Abbey to be disciplined, and it was said he was much improved on his return. However, Hunt managed to get the abbey into debt by £100, a considerable feat considering its excellent revenues and low running costs. Between 1527 and 1529, he disappeared from the scene and was replaced by Thomas Corveser, who had been his chaplain and one of his sternest critics. Corveser seems to have restored the abbey's finances and reputation. He remained abbot until the dissolution.

== Dissolution and after ==
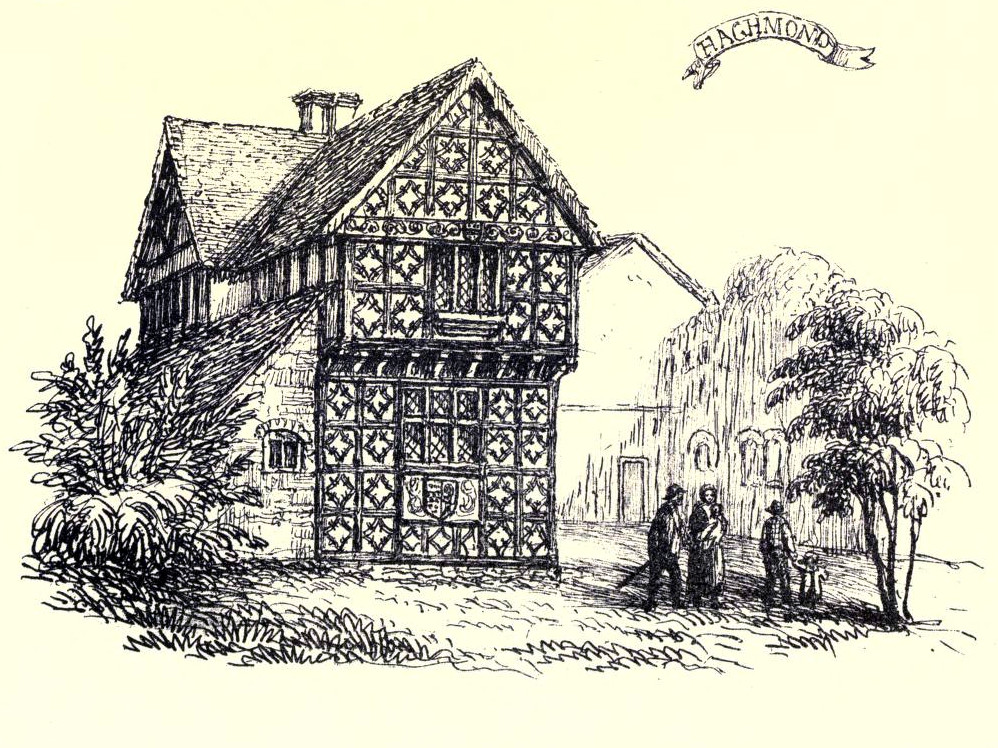
Timber house at Haughmond Abbey, home of the Barker family for four generations after the Dissolution of the Monasteries.

Initially intended to assess the value of church properties, the Valor Ecclesiasticus of 1535 reckoned the net annual value of Haughmond at £259 13s. 7¼d. The annual income at dissolution was actually reckoned at more than £350, as the new estimate included the abbey site and the granges of Homebarn and Sundorne, missed in earlier calculations. There was a £200 threshold set by the Suppression of Religious Houses Act 1535, which left Haughmond and Lilleshall in being. However, the precedent and the storm of criticism unleashed by the dissolution of the majority of religious houses intimidated many of the more successful institutions into surrender. Haughmond took this step in 1539, the year before the Second Act of Dissolution. The commission to dissolve the abbey was issued from Woodstock Palace on 23 August 1539 and signed by Thomas Cromwell. A deed of surrender was drawn up on 19 September. The abbot, Thomas Corveser, the prior, John Colfox, and nine canons signed it by 16 October, acknowledging Henry VIII as supreme over the Church of England on earth. Each of them received a generous pension: the abbot £40 a year, the prior £8, and the canons either £5 6s. 8d. or £6 each. Two canons did not sign, William Rolfe who received a pension of £7, and Richard Doone, who received only 40 shillings.

In 1540 the abbey site was sold to Sir Edward Littleton, a religious conservative, of Pillaton Hall, Staffordshire. Only two years later, Littleton sold it to Sir Rowland Hill, a Protestant who became Lord Mayor of London in 1547, and soon after sold Haughmond to the Barker family. During this period the Abbot's Hall and adjoining rooms were converted into a private residence, although the church and dormitory were already being plundered for building stone. Some of the other buildings around the little cloister continued as private accommodation, with the Little Cloister becoming a formal garden, up until the English Civil War. There was a fire during the Civil War and it left the hands of the wealthy, being turned over for use as a farm. A small cottage still stood in the area of the former abbots kitchen when the ruins were placed in the guardianship of the Office of Works in 1933.

The site was excavated in 1907 under the supervision of William Henry St John Hope and Harold Brakspear, who published their findings in The Archaeological Journal. More excavations took place between 1975 and 1979, directed by Jeffrey West for the Department of the Environment, in the north part of the cloister, the south transept and the south part of the choir of the abbey church, with the dual purpose of recovering the plan of the cloister walk and re-examining the early church identified by the 1907 excavation. Further work was undertaken by English Heritage in 2002 and is the most comprehensive analysis and survey of the earthworks to be undertaken to date.

Today English Heritage looks after the site. The site did have a small museum and shop, but this closed in 2017. The site is now free to enter and open all year round.

In 2023 the former ticket office and museum were refurbished by English Heritage and have now reopened to provide a small exhibition space and information point selling guidebooks. The site is now staffed by English Heritage volunteers.

== Burials at the abbey ==
- John FitzAlan, 6th Earl of Arundel
- Maud de Verdon, (died 27 November 1283), his wife
- John FitzAlan, 7th Earl of Arundel
- Isabella Mortimer, Countess of Arundel
- Richard FitzAlan, 8th Earl of Arundel
- Alice of Saluzzo, Countess of Arundel
- Edmund FitzAlan, 9th Earl of Arundel
- Alice de Warenne, Countess of Arundel

== The ruins today ==
Extant ruins of Haughmond Abbey

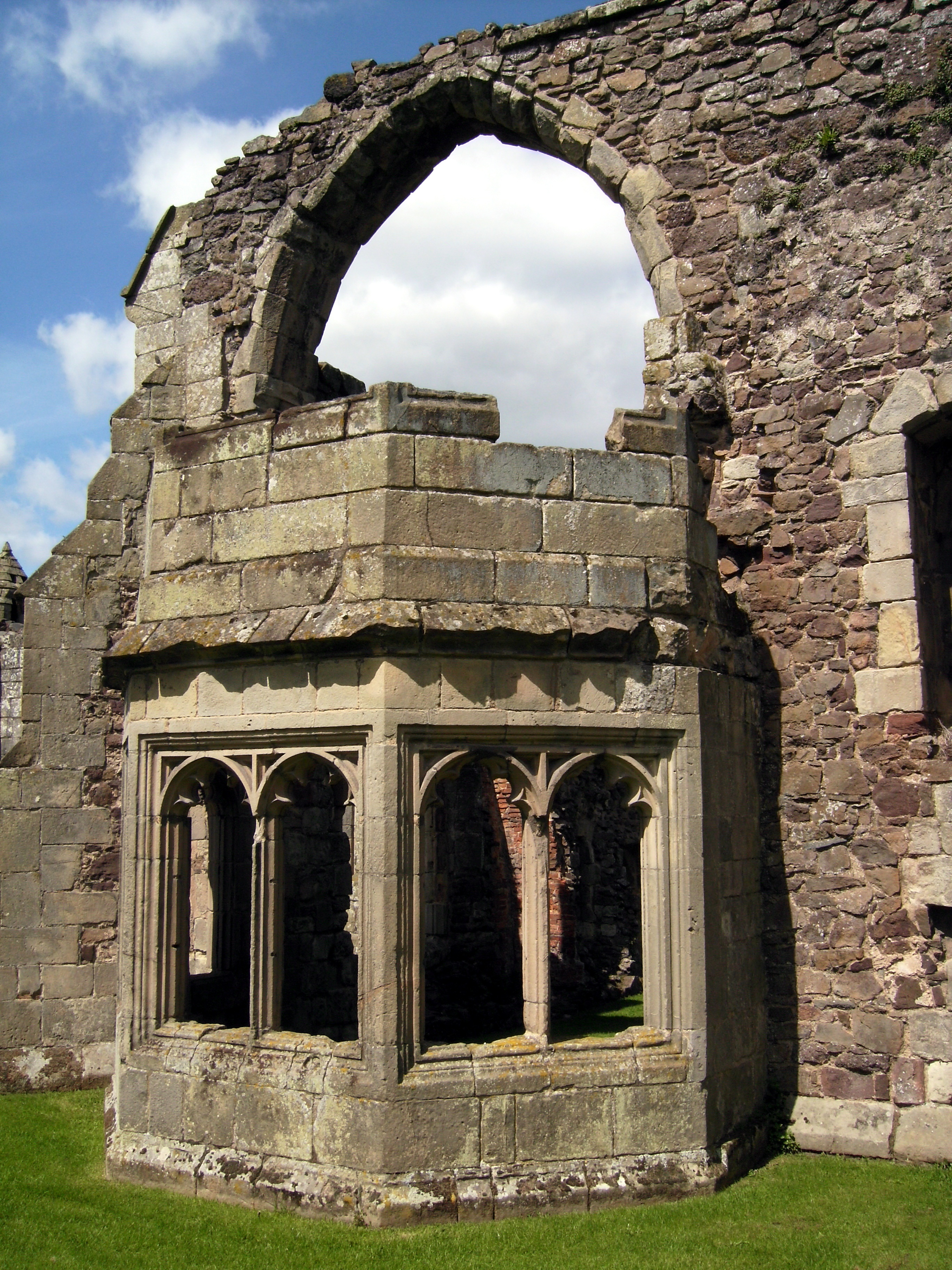
Bay window of abbot's private rooms.

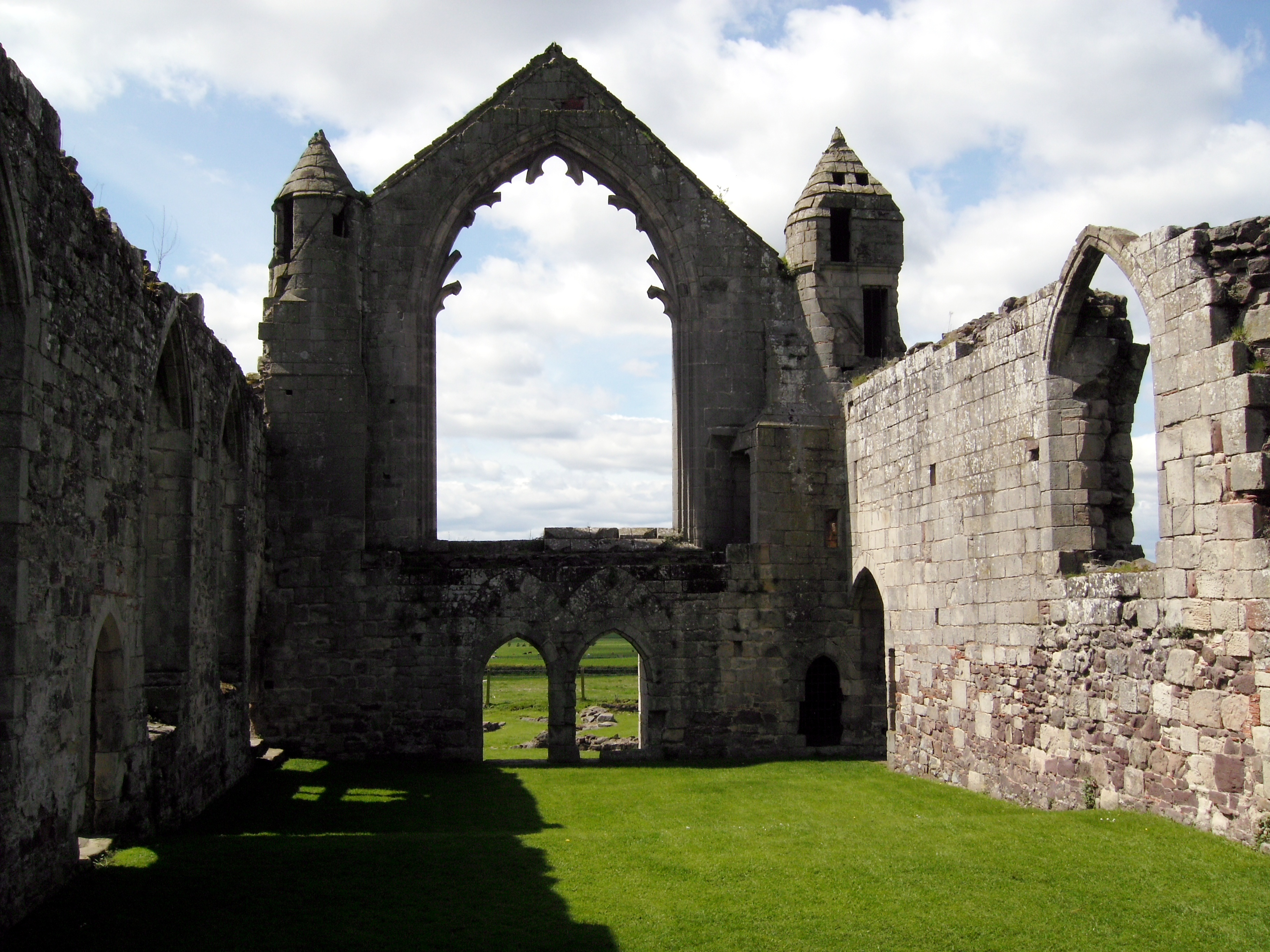
Interior of abbot's hall.

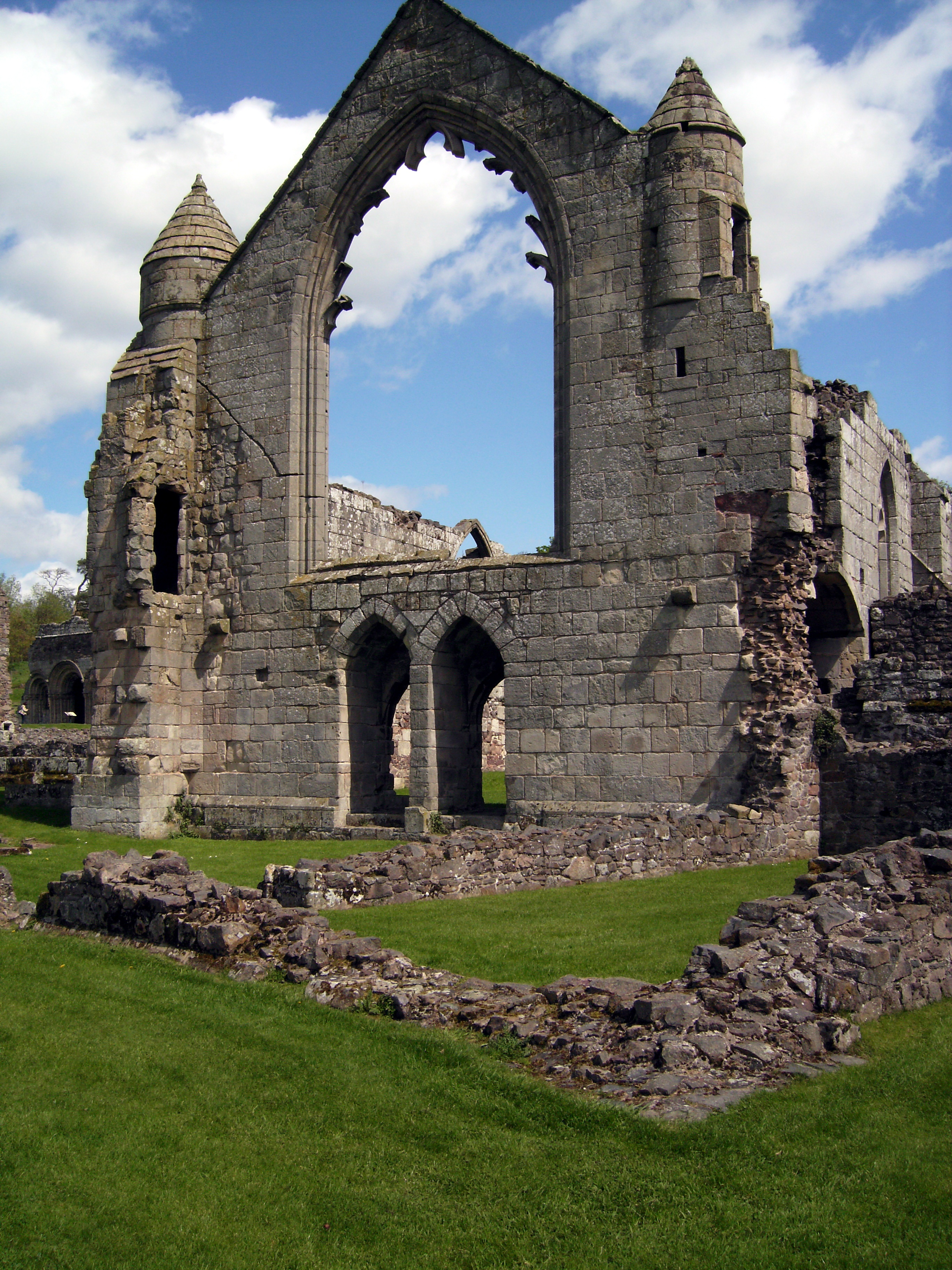
Exterior view of abbot's hall, showing west window.

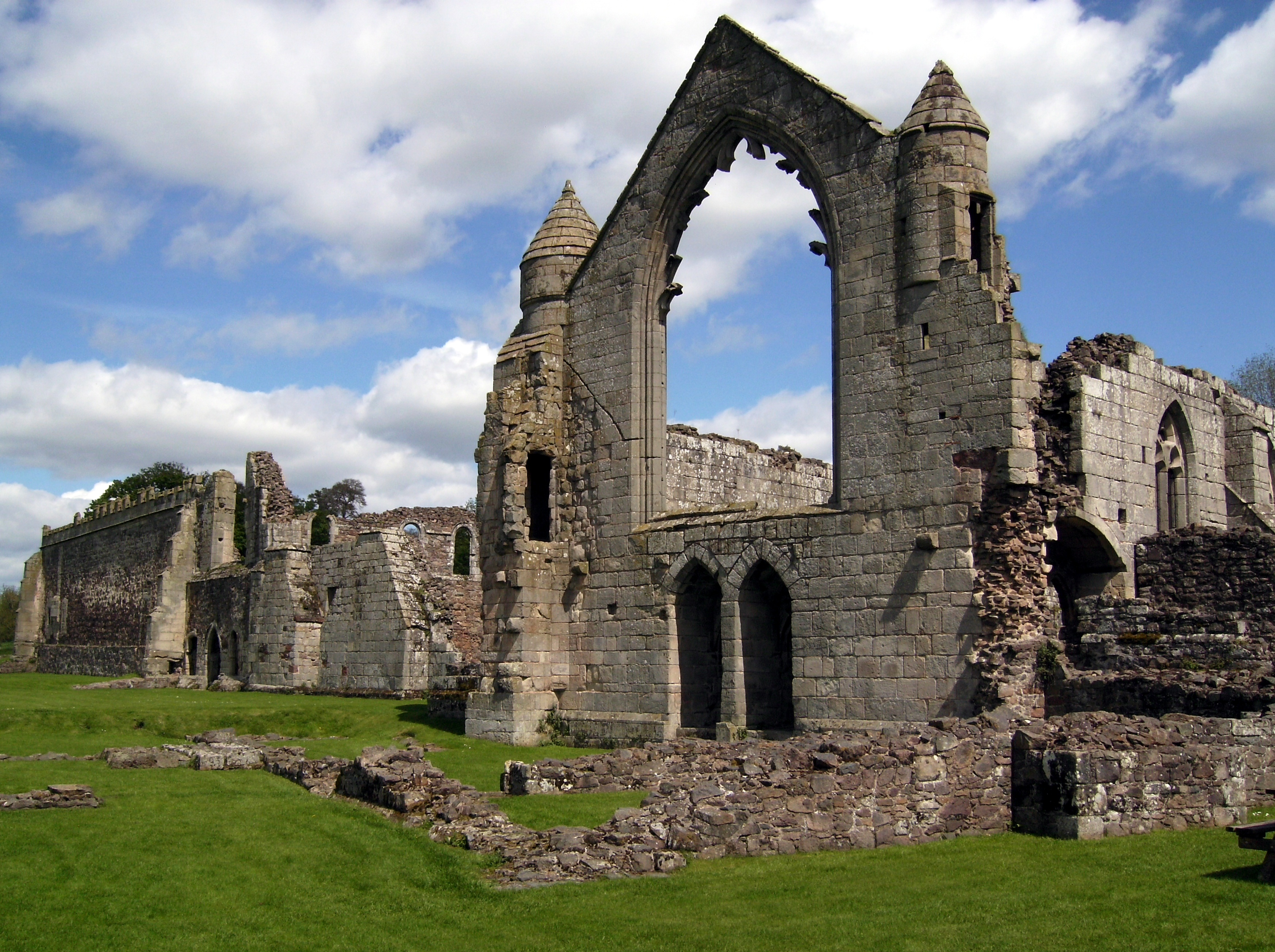
West side of the abbey, showing (from right) exterior of Abbot's hall, kitchens, refectory undercroft, main cloister.

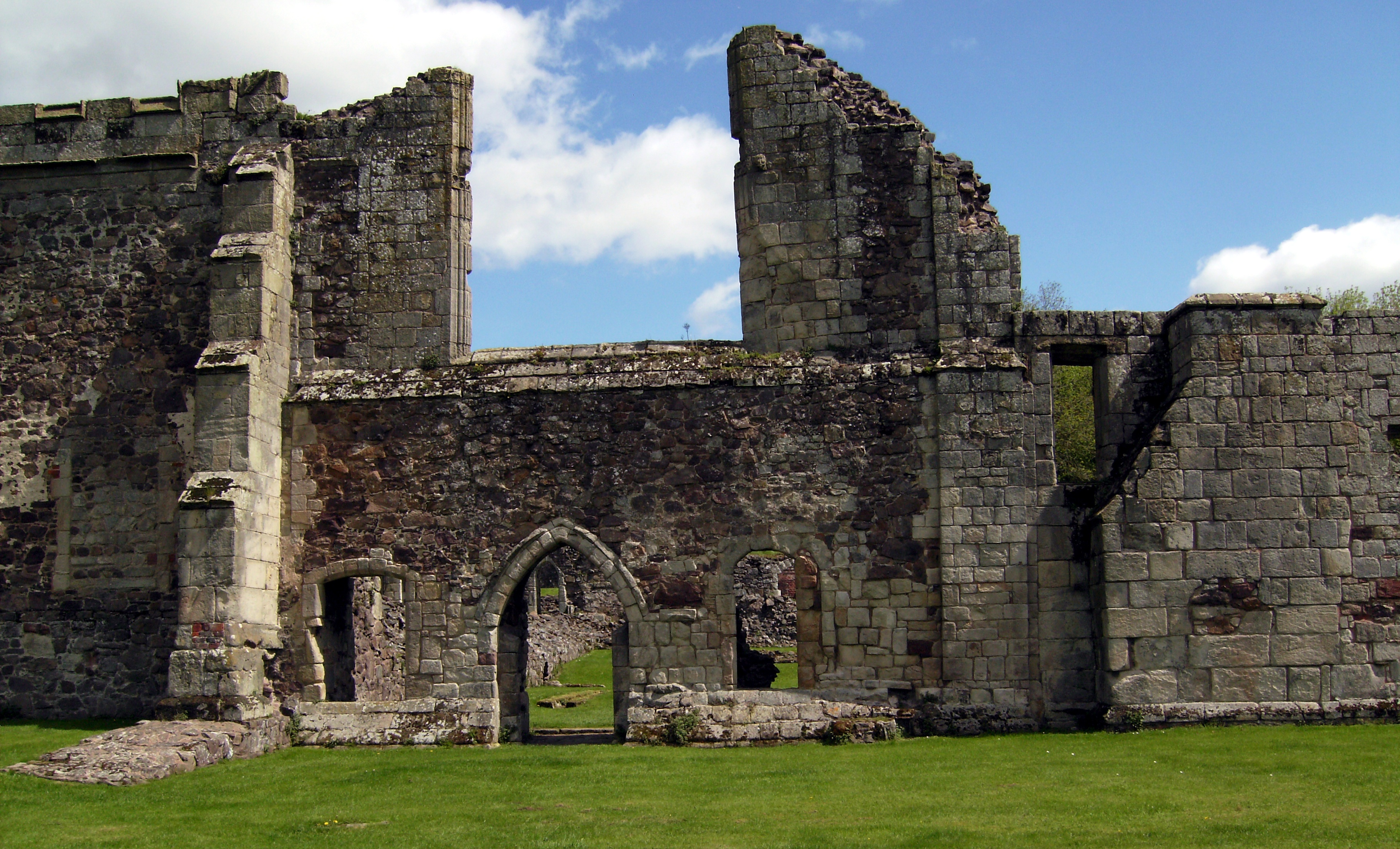
View from west, showing entrance to the refectory undercroft, the main storage area for provisions, and above it the west window of the refectory.

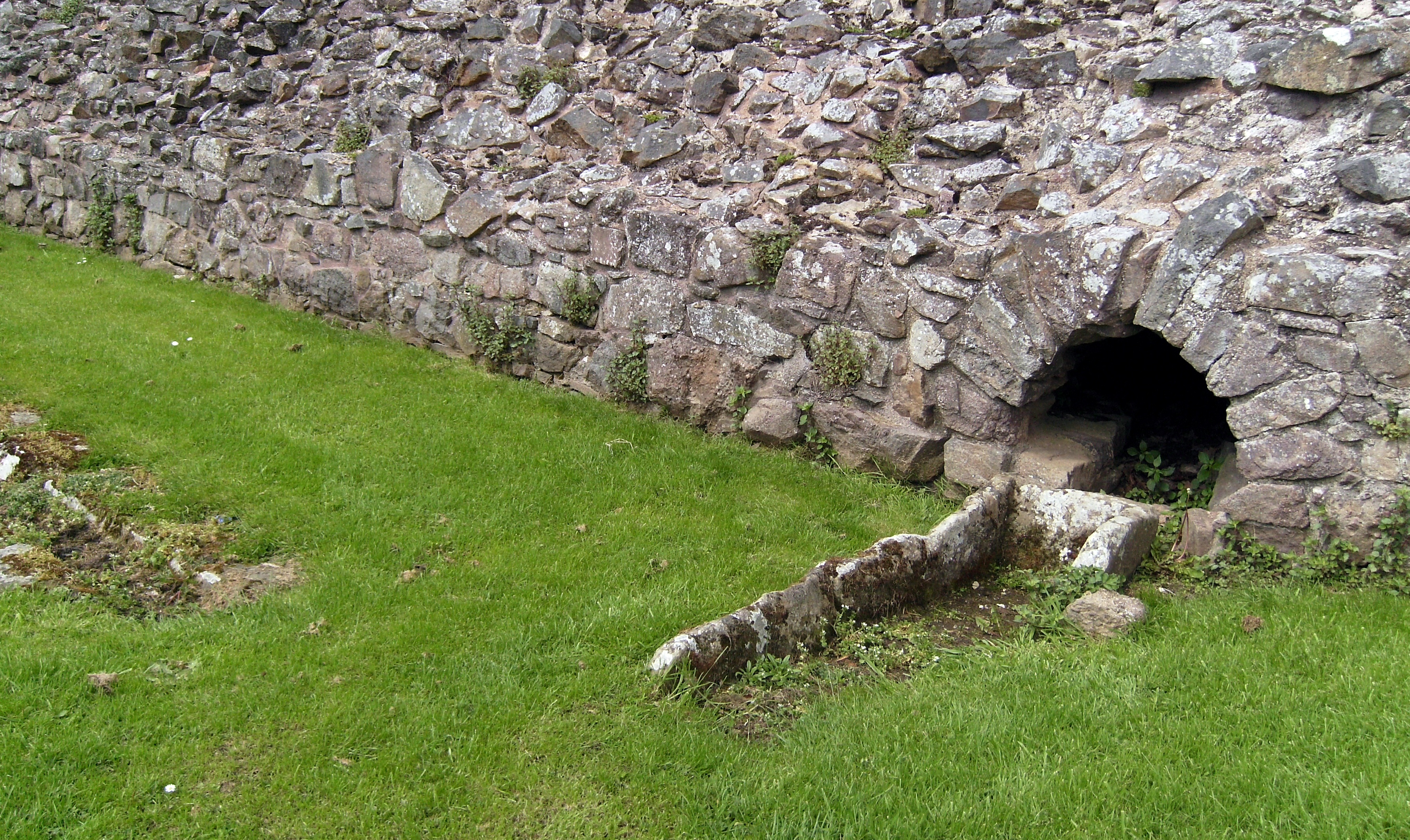
Sluice in the refectory undercroft.

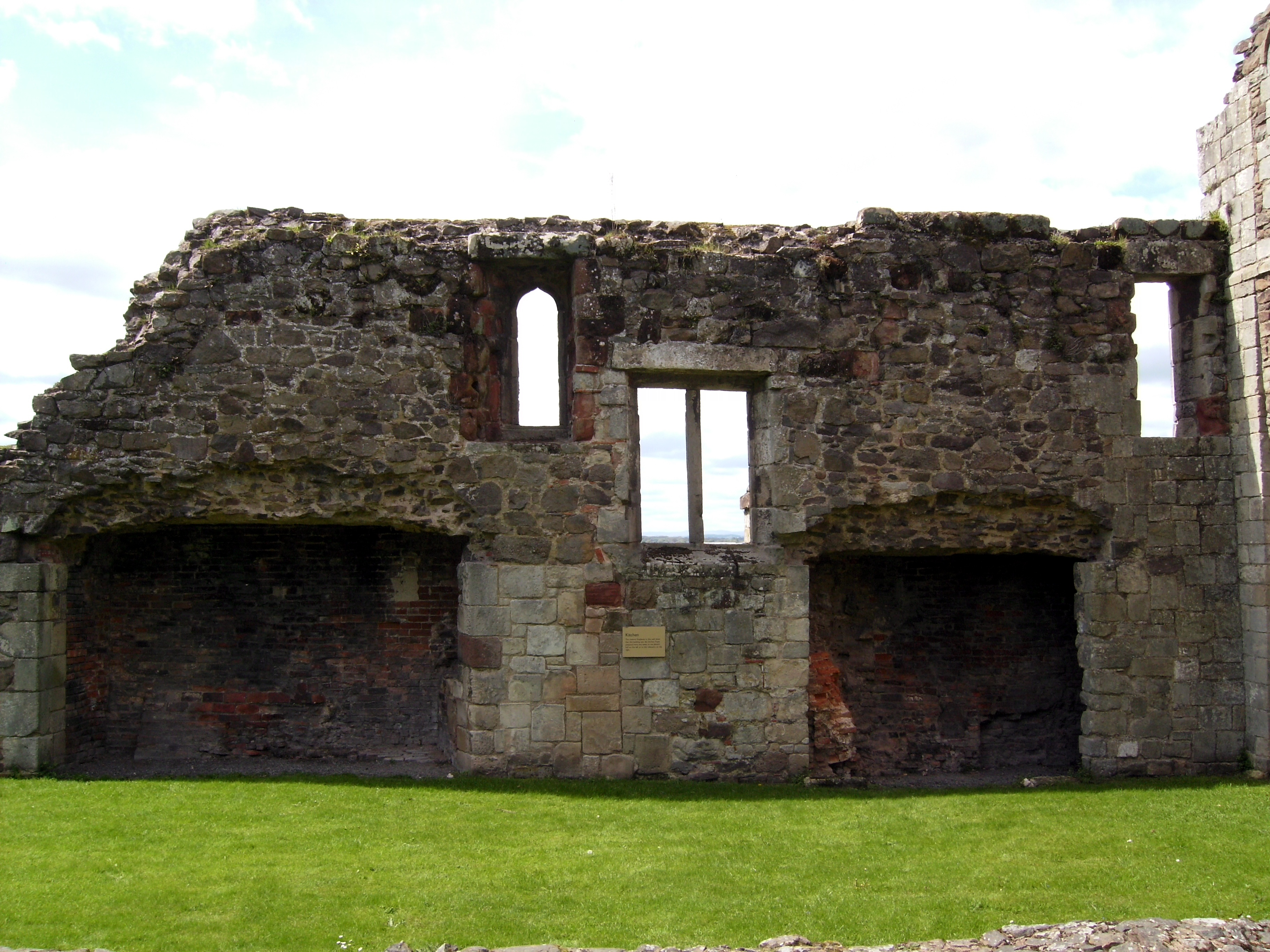
Site of abbey kitchens, with two fireplaces prominent.

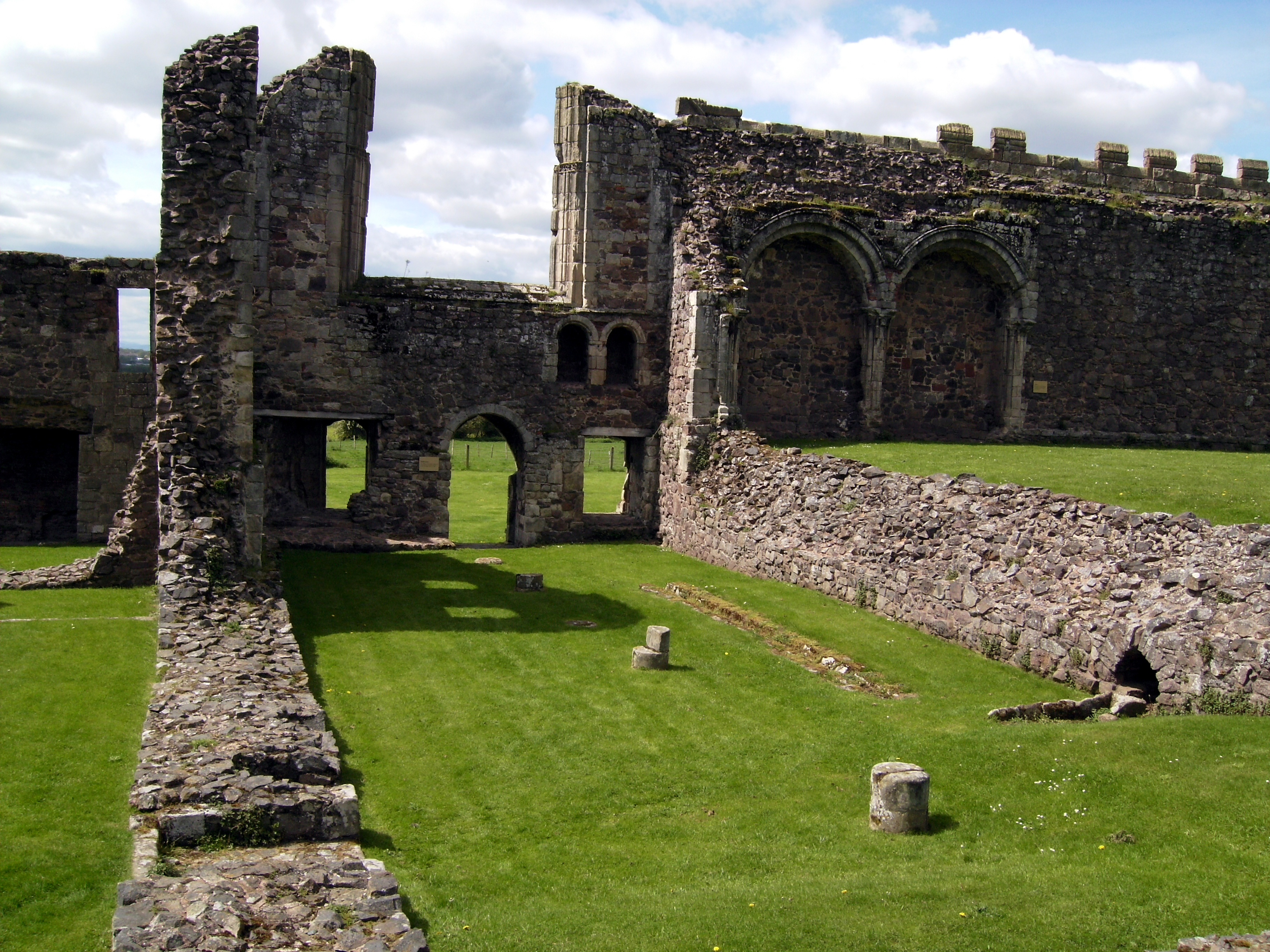
View of refectory site, showing undercroft and lavers at cloister entrance.

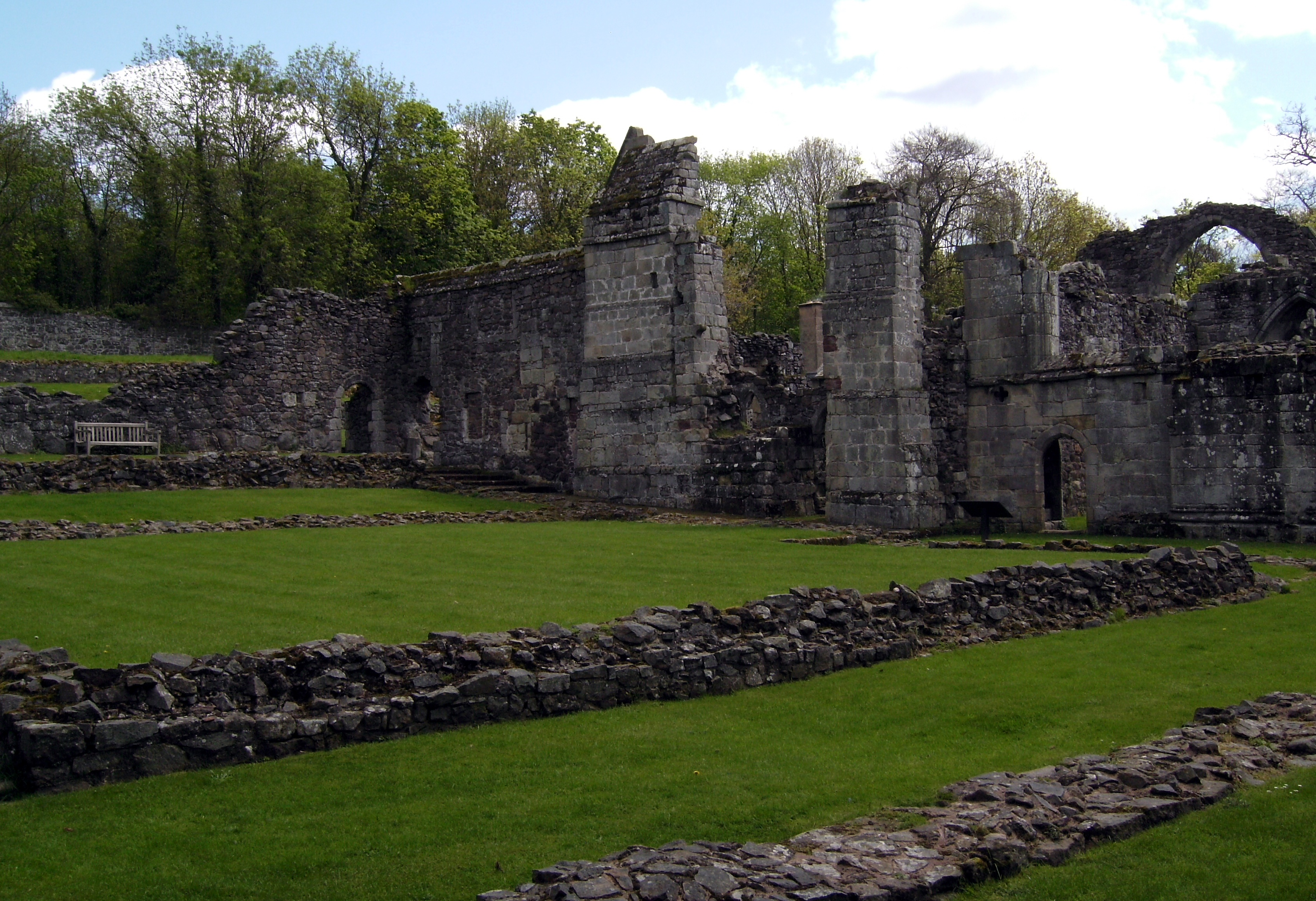
General view south-east across the little cloister to the abbot's residence.

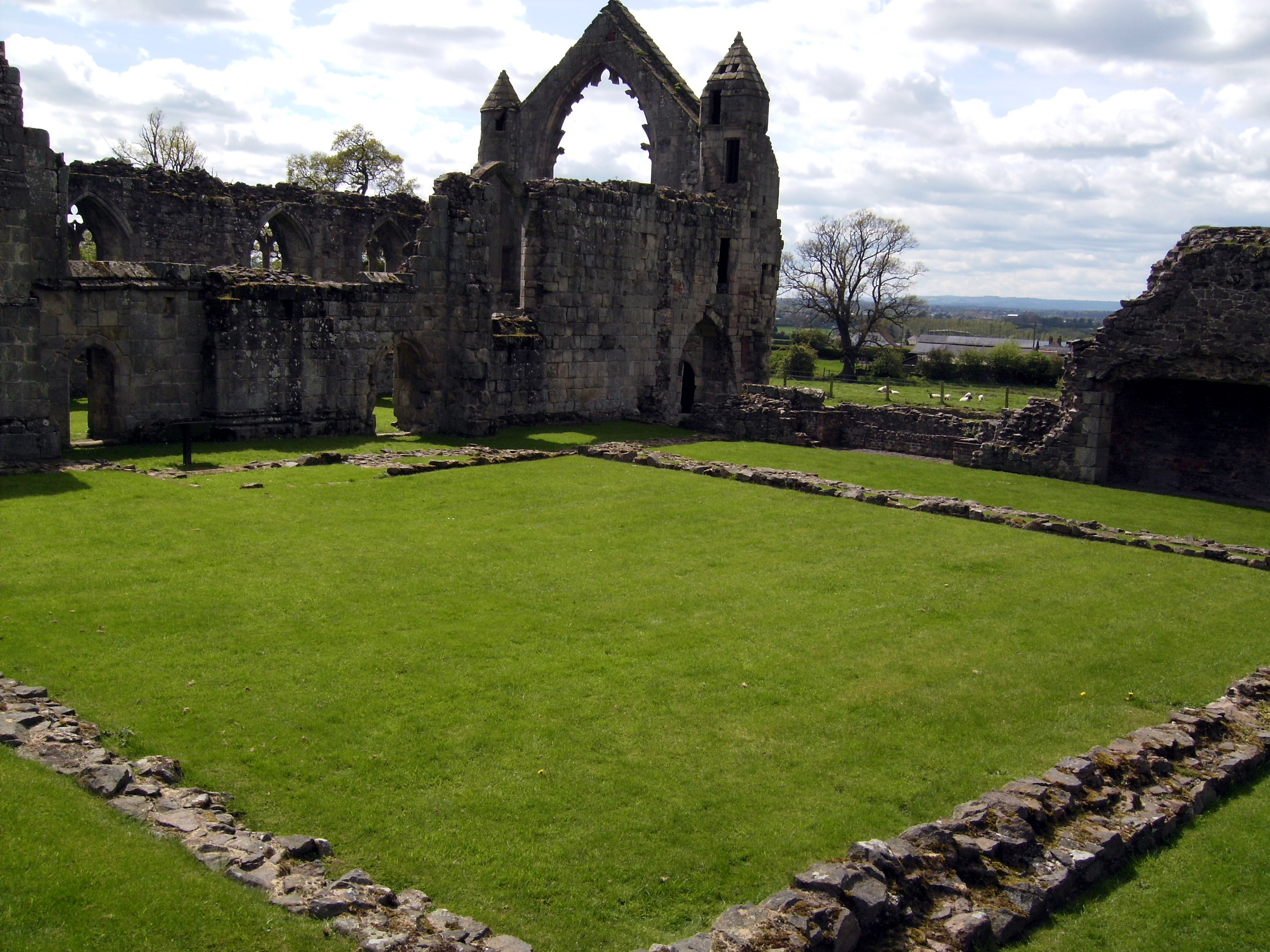
General view south west across the small cloister to the abbot's hall.

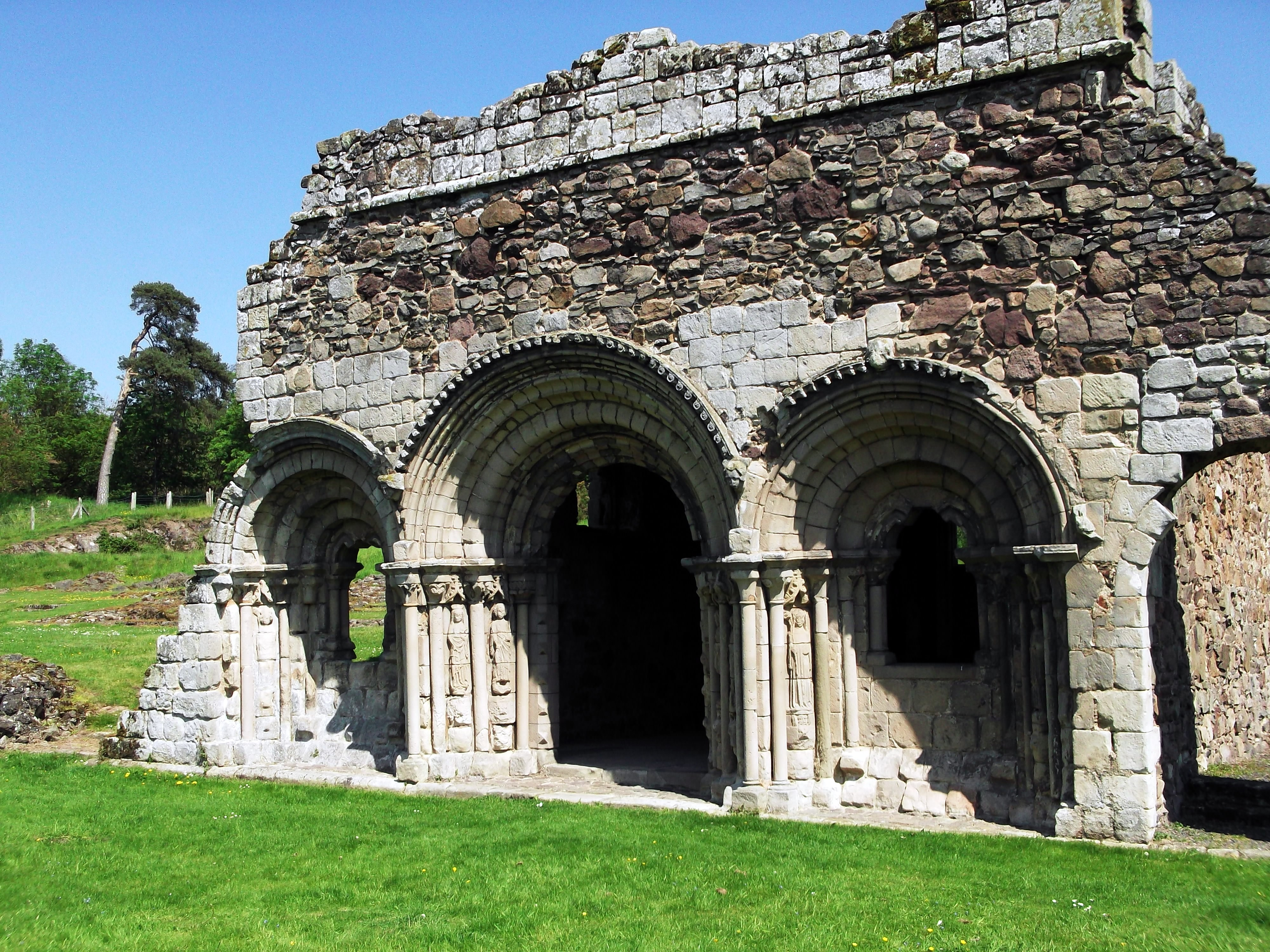
Frontage of the chapter house.

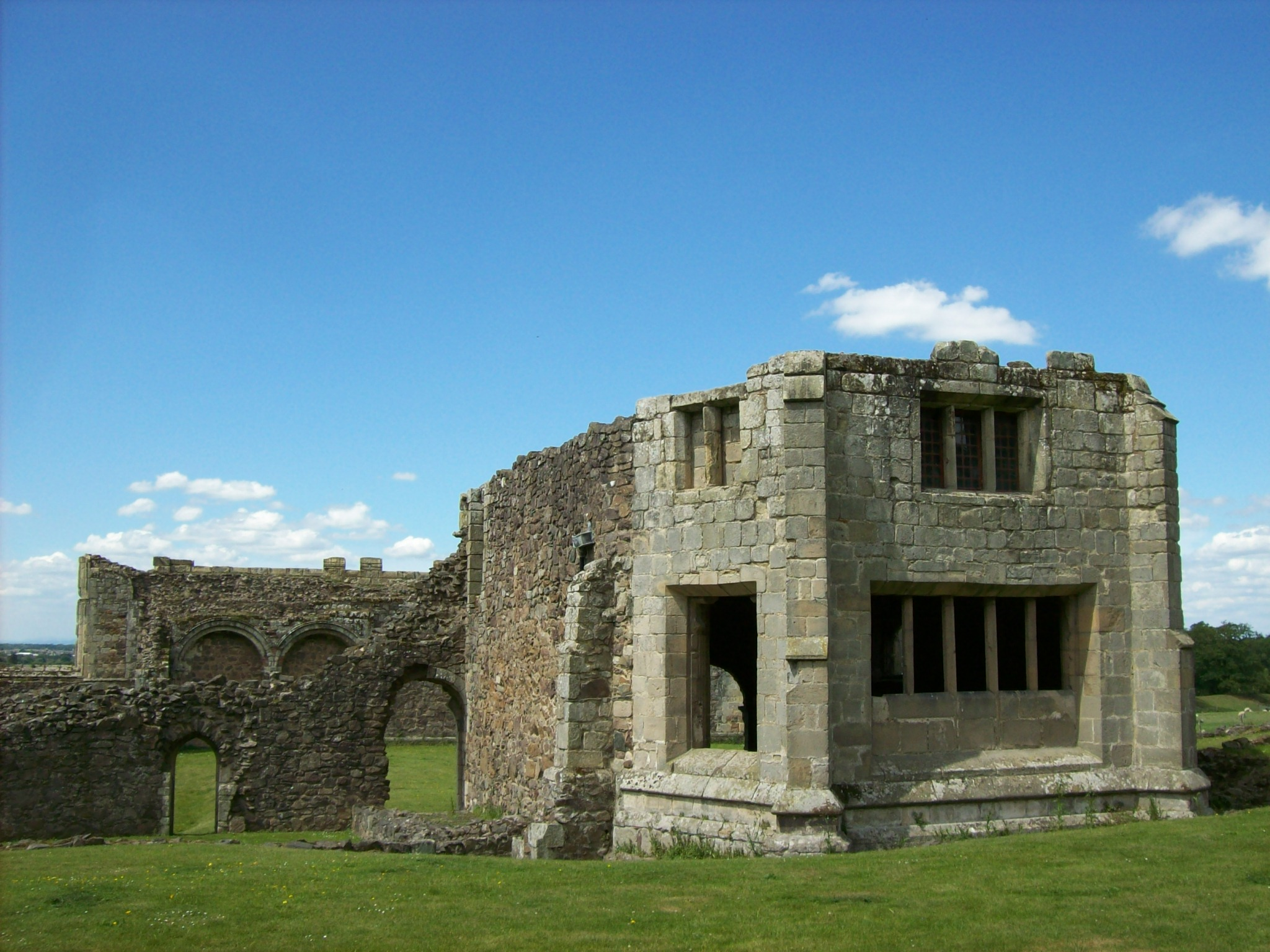
Rear view of the chapter house.

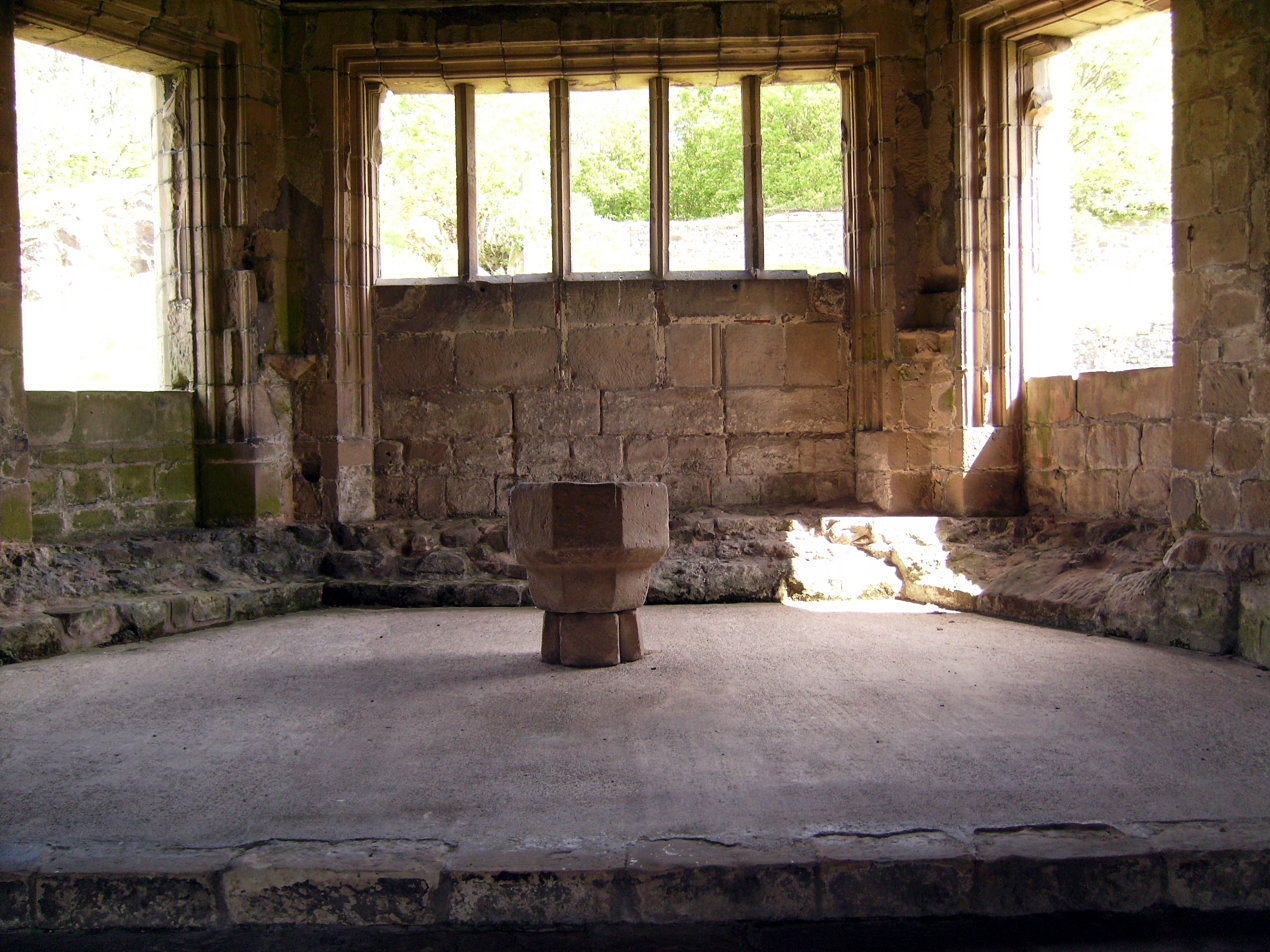
Interior of chapter house, octagonal font from church in centre.

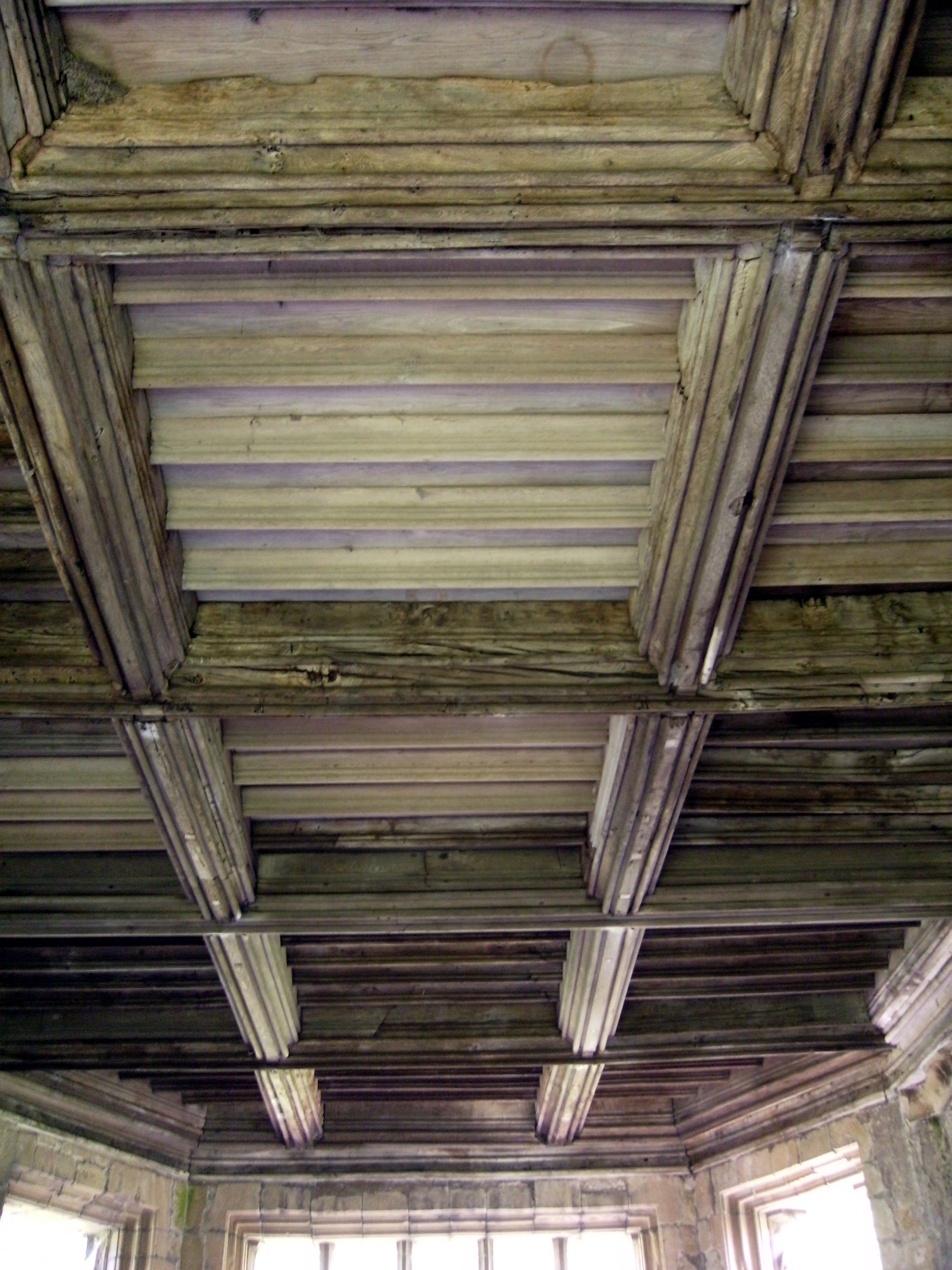
Late medieval timber ceiling in the chapter house.

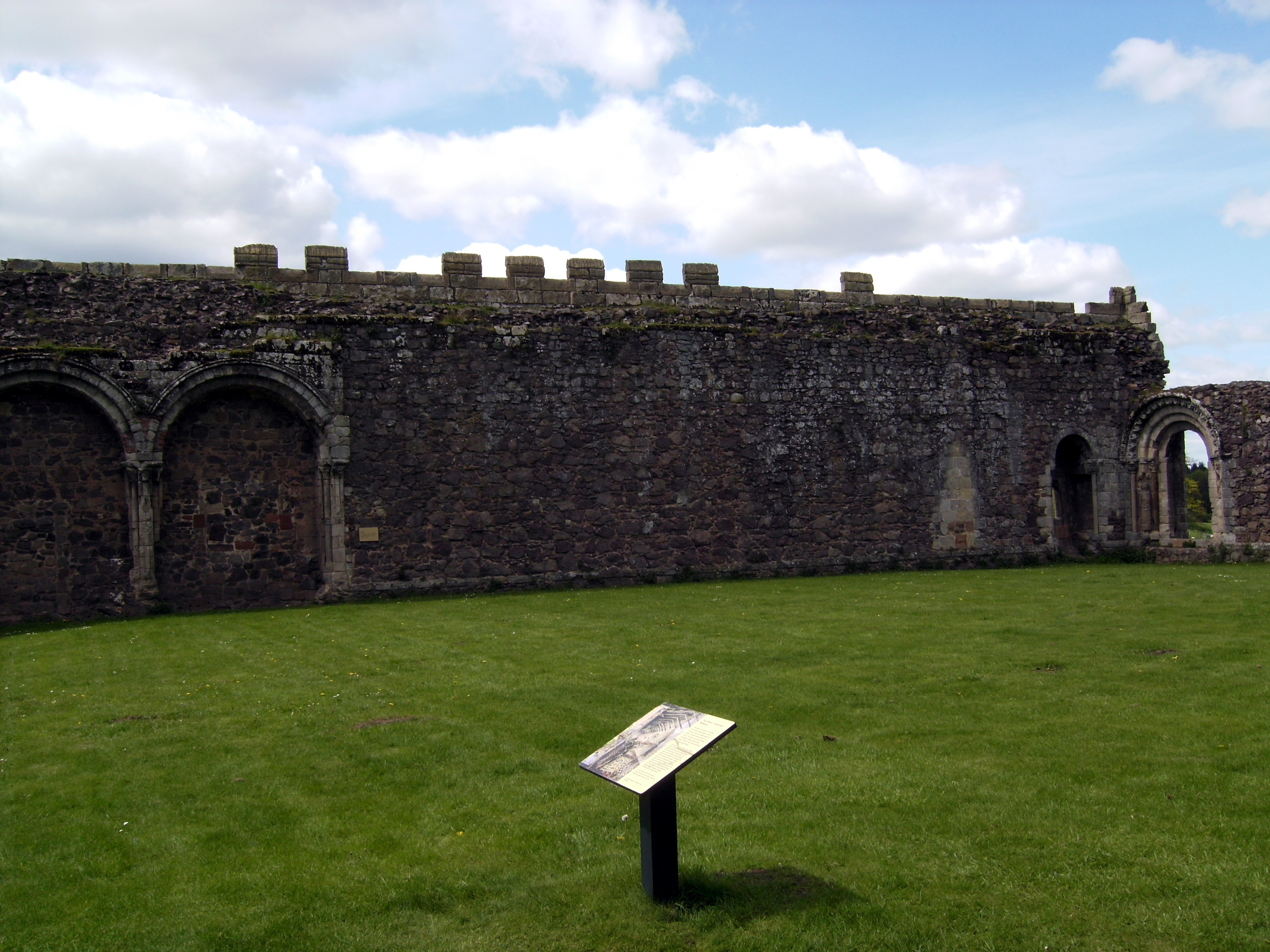
General view across main cloister.

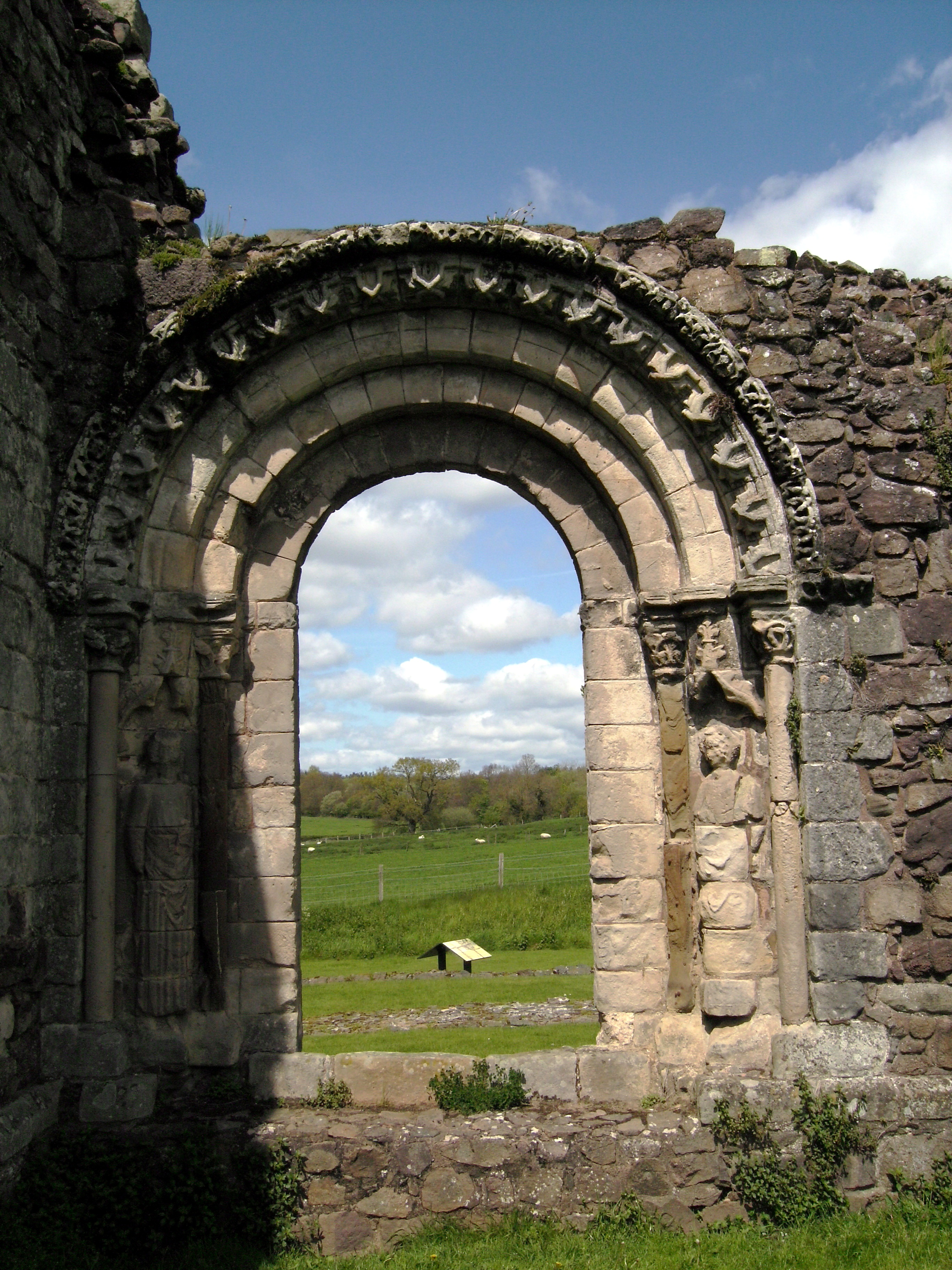
Processional entrance to church.

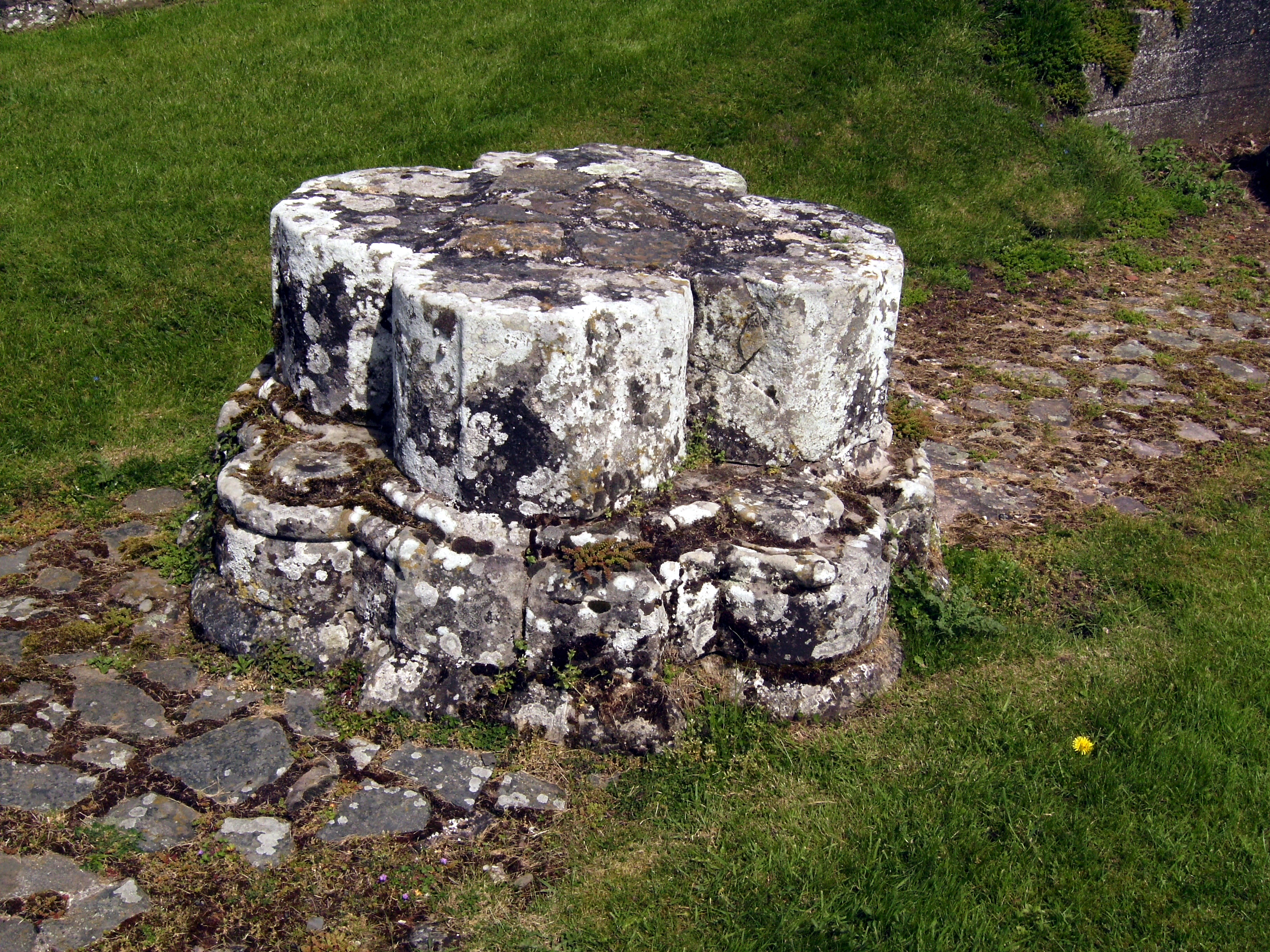
Stump of nave pillar.

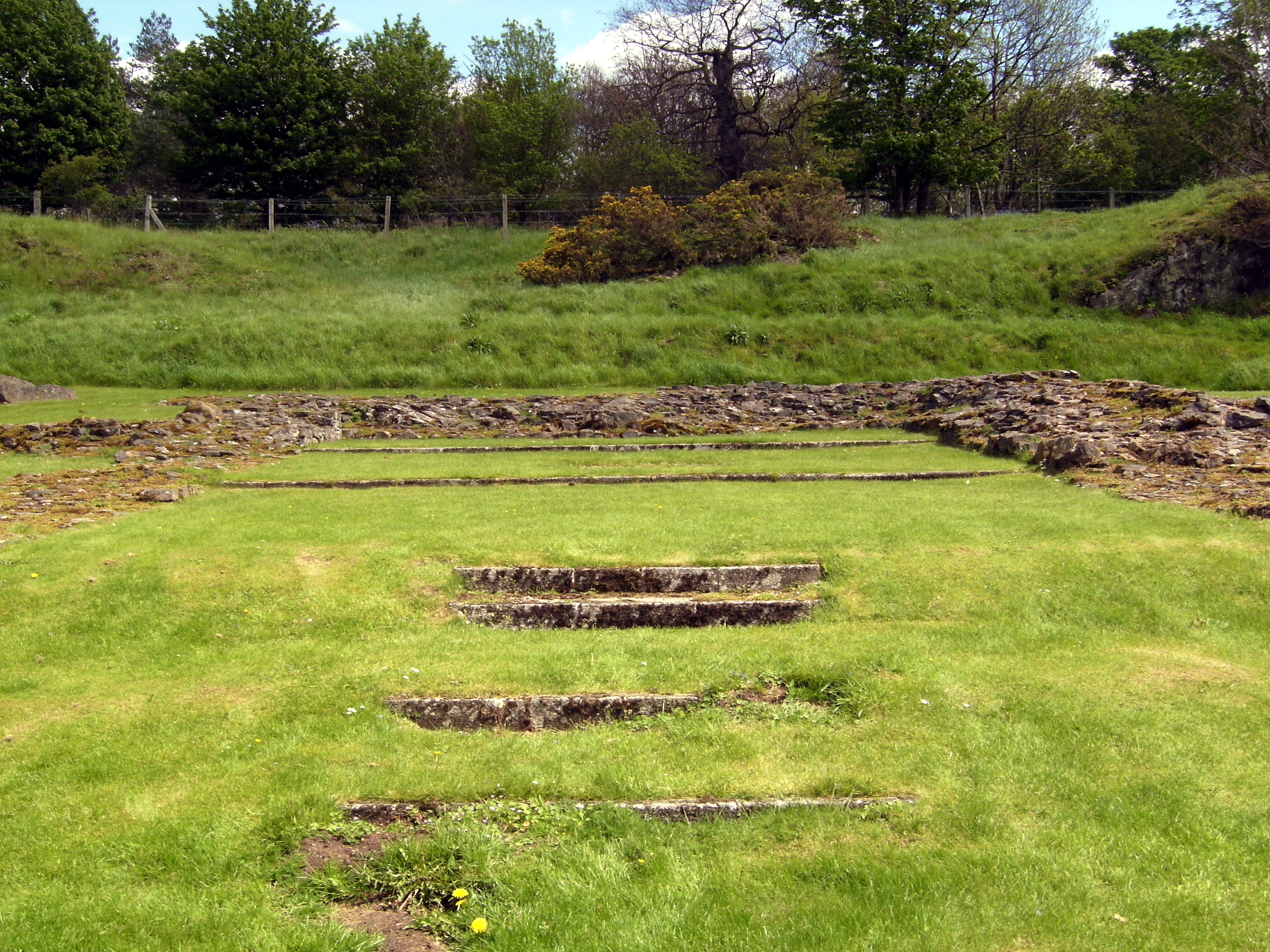
Site of the sanctuary.

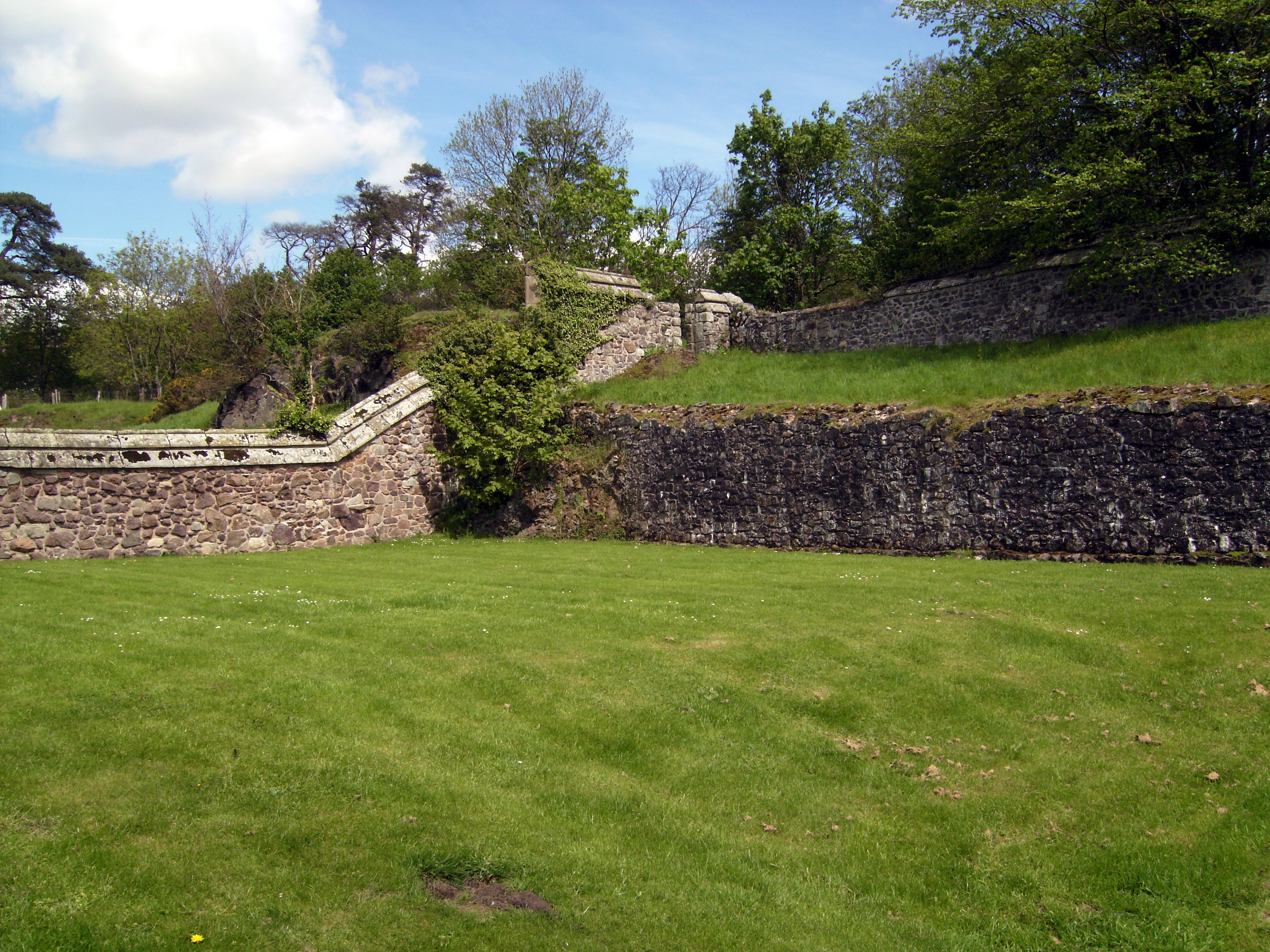
Site of garden established by Abbot Nicholas of Longnor, elected 1325.

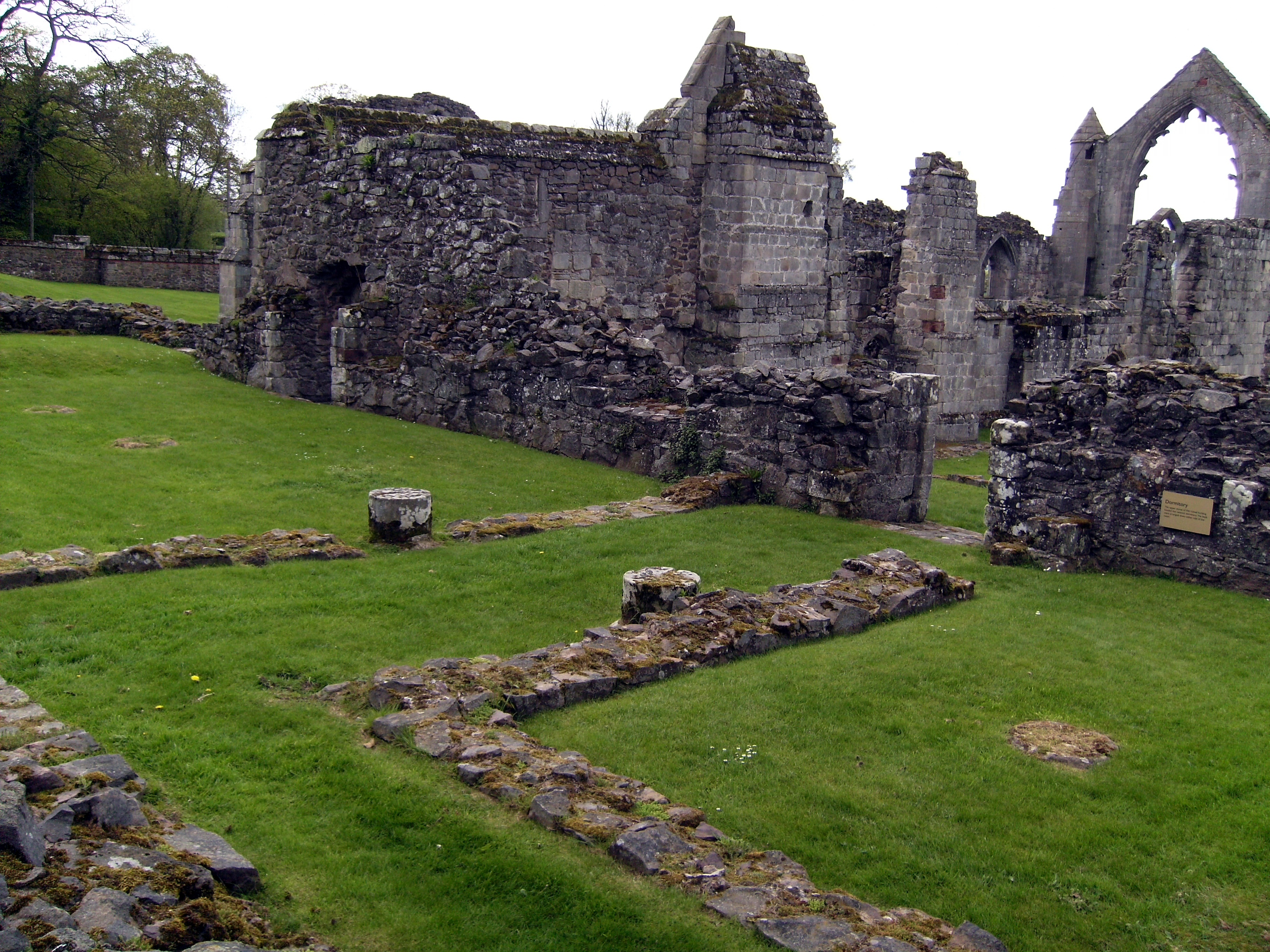
Site of canons' doormitory.

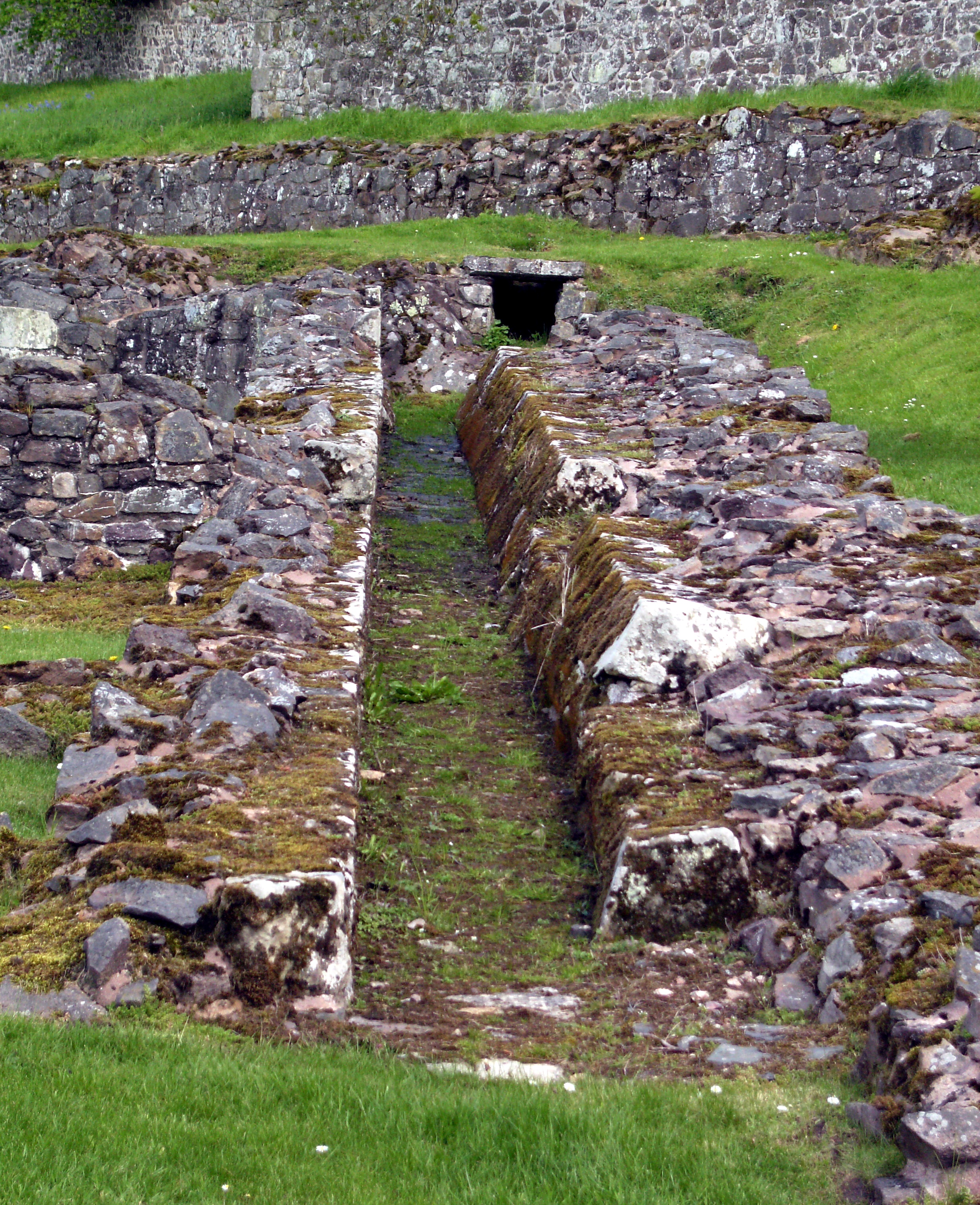
Reredorter or latrine area of the dormitories.

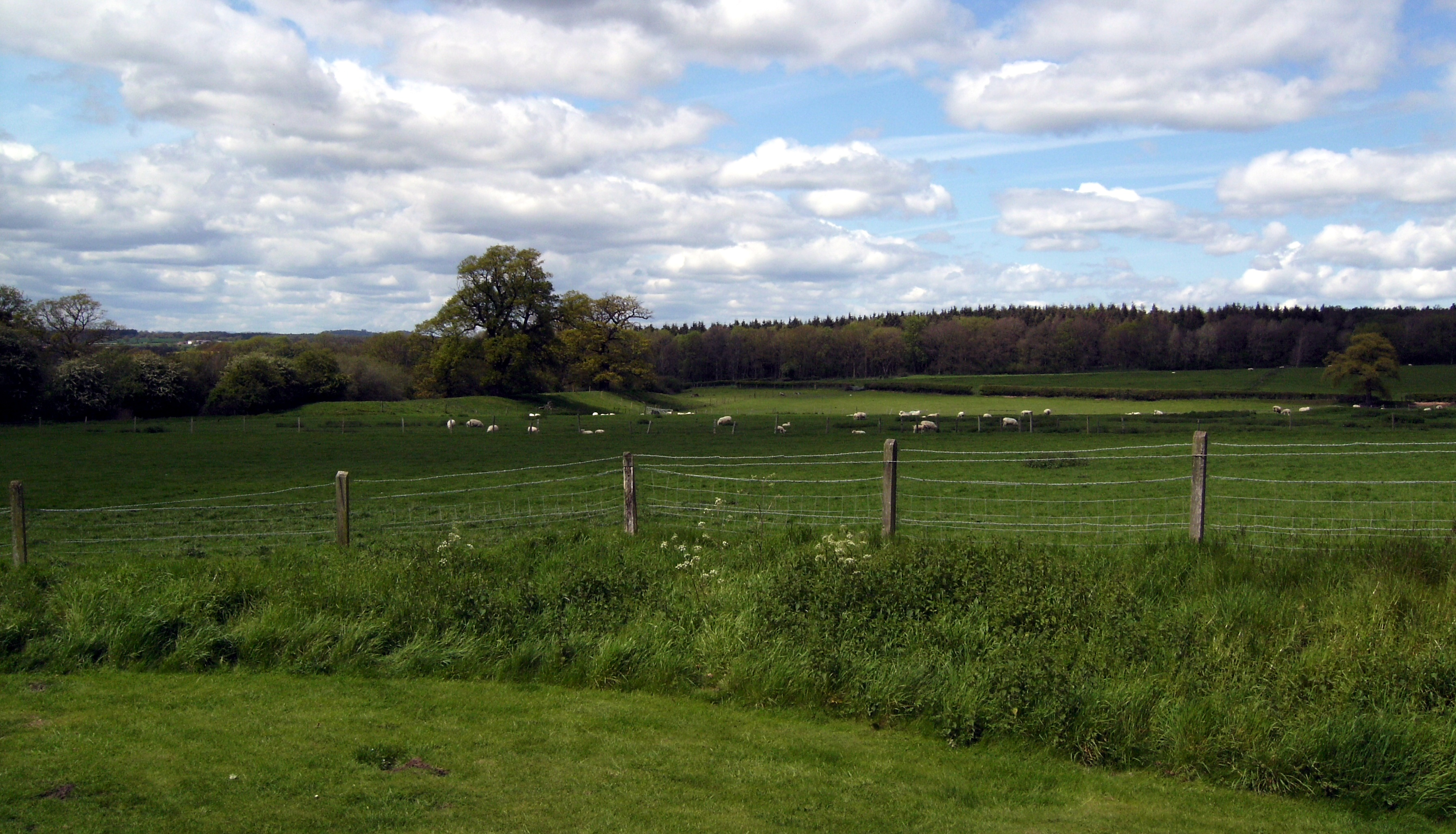
View NNW across the former horticultural areas of the abbey.

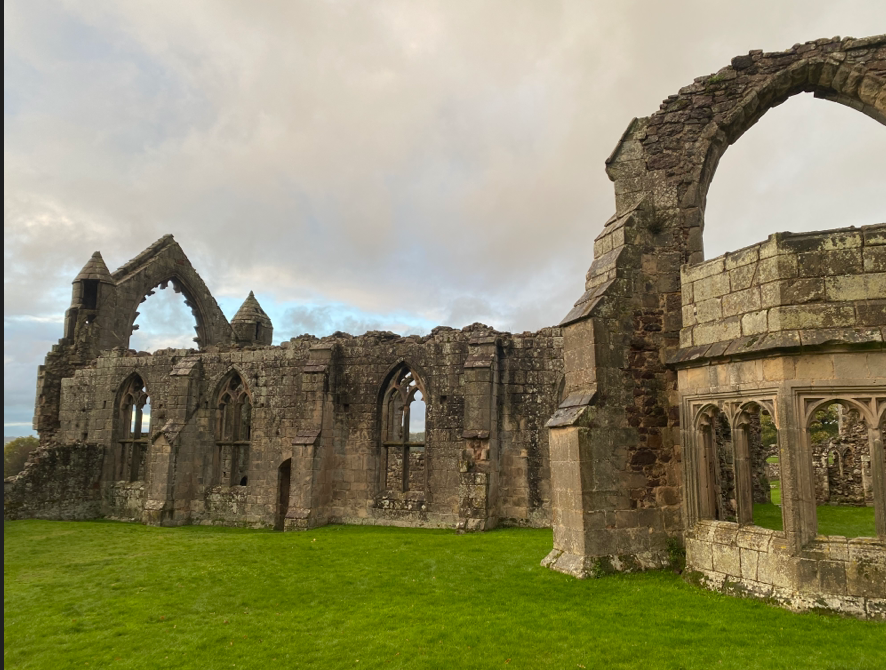
Haughmond Abbey on a cloudy day

The Haughmond Abbey buildings, like those at Lillsehall, show signs of Cistercian architectural influence. The standing remains are of white sandstone rubble construction with ashlar dressings. At the highest points, floors and lower walls were made by shaping the red sandstone that underlies the site. Most of the buildings were grouped around two cloisters. They include: the foundations and west cloister doorway of the late 12th- and early 14th-century church; the late 12th-century chapter house (which is still roofed); the west wall of the warming house and dorter; the walls of the frater and its undercroft; and the early 13th century infirmary, flanked by the abbot's lodging to the east. Apart from a few walls, little else has survived from the western side of the site and, at the northern edge, the abbey church has completely disappeared – although the cruciform ground plan is still clearly visible.

The abbey site would have been enclosed by a perimeter ditch but this is no longer apparent. The precinct is still partly enclosed by a wall of undressed stone, around the south and west sides. The entrance to the abbey was about 130 metres north of the church, where the gatehouse has been traced. There would have been other buildings serving the community and its guests between the gatehouse and the church but these too remain only in bare outline. The remains of the artificial landscape created in the Middle Ages are discernible further to the north. A reservoir and three possible fish ponds can be identified, along with various other medieval features.

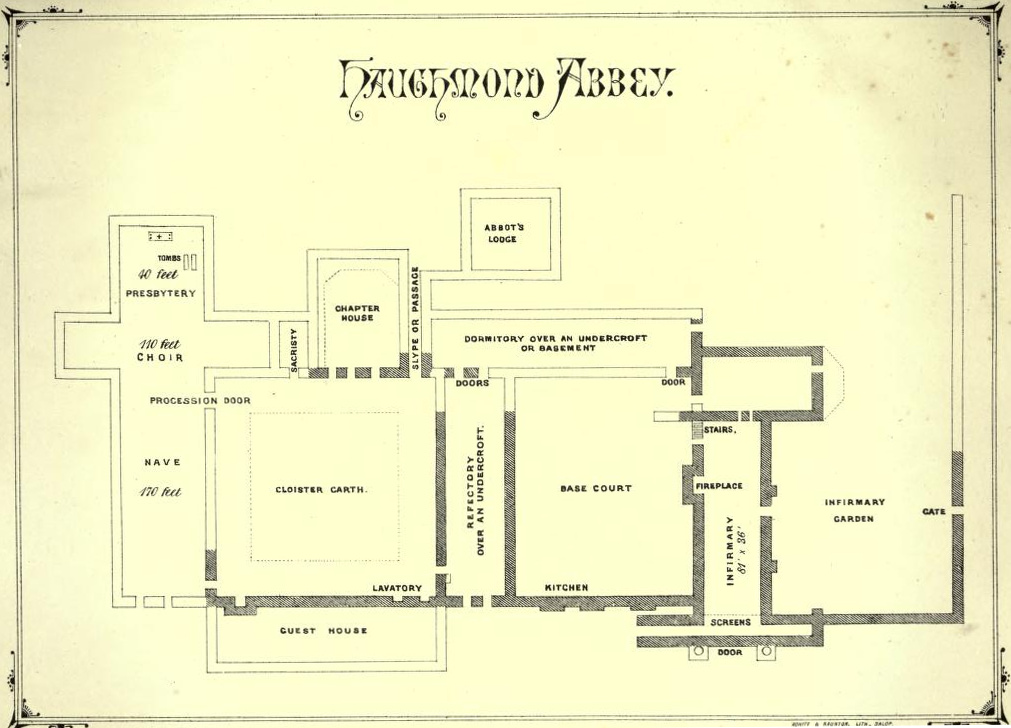
Layout of the main abbey buildings, according to Mackenzie Walcott. Annotations in red indicate the main changes due to more recent archaeology, building and nomenclature.

The public entrance to the abbey site is now on the south side, where the extant ruins are at their most impressive. Visitors are confronted by the elaborately decorated, five-sided bay window of the abbot's private quarters. This is of very late date – probably the second half of the 15th century. The accommodation for the abbots became steadily more luxurious and more private throughout the history of the abbey. Beyond the window are remains of the 12th-century abbot's rooms, which were on a far more modest scale. The large and impressive abbot's hall, with its great west window of six lights, was built in the 14th century, partly over some of the 12th-century abbot's buildings. Below the window doorways led to the service buildings: remains and traces of these mainly 12th-century structures are still visible beyond the western end of the hall. This southern end of the site was considerably modified but preserved after the dissolution, when it was used as a family residence.

From the western side of the ruins, the abbot's hall window remains the dominant structure, but walls of the kitchen and dining areas and of the main cloister are easily made out beyond it. It is possible to walk through the entrance to the undercroft of the frater or refectory, below the great west refectory window, which would once have been an impressive structure when it was inserted in the 13th century. The refectory and its undercroft separated the little cloister to the south from the larger northern cloister. The undercroft was the main storage area for provisions, which were brought in through its western entrance from the abbey grounds. A sluice supplied by a stream is on the northern side of the undercroft. The undercroft linked via service steps to the frater above, and by a door to the kitchens, which lay along the western side of the little cloister. The large fireplaces in the west wall of the kitchen range are still very prominent. The frater, being on the upper floor, has gone, but the main cloister wall closest its entrance has two large, arched niches that contained the lavers for the canons' ceremonial ablution before meals. It is not clear how water was supplied to the lavers and all trace of the wash basins has disappeared.

The main cloister was a large, almost square, open area, not arcaded like the little cloister, but open to the sky. It gave access to the main theatres of communal life: the refectory, the chapter house, the canons' dorter and the church itself.

The chapter house is of exceptional quality and in a good state of preservation. It is fronted by three heavily decorated round arches of the late 13th century, the larger centre arch a doorway and the flanking arches originally windows. The shafts between were built with carved capitals, but a series of sculptures of saints was added to them in the 14th century. The chapter house was substantially remodelled in the 16th century, perhaps subsequent to the complaints about its condition under Abbot Pontesbury. There is no trace of the original seating, which would have allowed the canons to sit around the walls of the building. The chapter house was demolished after the dissolution, apart from the western arches and south side, with another building taking its place. This was fitted with an impressive moulded, wooden ceiling, probably moved from another part of the abbey. This remains in place. The parlour would have been next to the chapter house but nothing remains of it.

The church is the most completely ruined part of the site, with little in the way of upstanding walls. A single Norman architecture arched doorway, leading from the cloister into the nave of the church shows fine foliage moulding, with the sculptured figures of St Peter and Saint Paul either side of the opening. This is on the south side of the church's western end – an austere choice, apparently unaltered. Lilleshall and most similar abbeys had their processional door near close to the transept and dorter, and many had night stairs for the convenience of the monks or canons. At Haughmond the canons had to cross the cloisters, in all weathers, and all times of day and night. There are traces of an early 12th-century church, found during excavations, close to the south transept. However, the easily discerned cruciform plan of the late 12th-century building provides the main framework. The natural upward slope to the east was used to create a symbolism of spiritual ascent, with steps leading from the nave to the choir, and more from the choir to the sanctuary and high altar – a rise of about four metres. The church was about 60 metres (almost exactly 200 feet) in length – about the same as at Lilleshall, which it seems to have resembled closely – and originally aisleless. However, an aisle and porch were added on the northern side in the 13th century. A chapel was added to the northern side of the presbytery in the 15th: this may have been the chapel of St Anne, where the canons served the Le Strange chantry around 1480. Burials of lay benefactors took place in the church and elsewhere on the site: the graves of Richard FitzAlan, 8th Earl of Arundel (died 1302) and his mother, Isabella Mortimer, Countess of Arundel (died c. 1292), both very important benefactors, are marked in the sanctuary area.

The remains of the canon's dorter or dormitory are slight. It was probably a two-storey building, with the bottom floor used for storage – like the frater – and for a warming house. At the northern end, the dorter is backed by Longnor's Garden, the area set out by the abbot for culinary and medicinal herbs, which contained a dovecote in the 15th century. The present guidebook suggests that the dorter was divided in the 15th century to provide quarters for the prior, the abbot's deputy. However, the text of the 1459 agreement between Abbot Richard Burnell and the canons, covering the responsibilities of the prior, suggests that the prior's quarters were under the dorter, with an entrance from the cloister, next to the parlour, and access to Longnor's garden at the rear. They had been refurbished at considerable cost and effort by a former prior, William of Shrewsbury, then still living, and were to pass to his successors only after his death. At the southern end of the dorter, a doorway led to the reredorter, the communal washing and latrine block. Although the facilities themselves have gone, there is a very clear length of stone drain, still supplied by a diverted stream.

== See also ==
- Grade I listed buildings in Shropshire
- Listed buildings in Uffington, Shropshire
