= FitzAlan =

Origin
- Meaning: patronymic, son of Alan fitz Flaad
- Region of origin: France

Other names
- Variant forms: Fitz-Alan, Fitzalan, Fitzallen, Fitz Alan

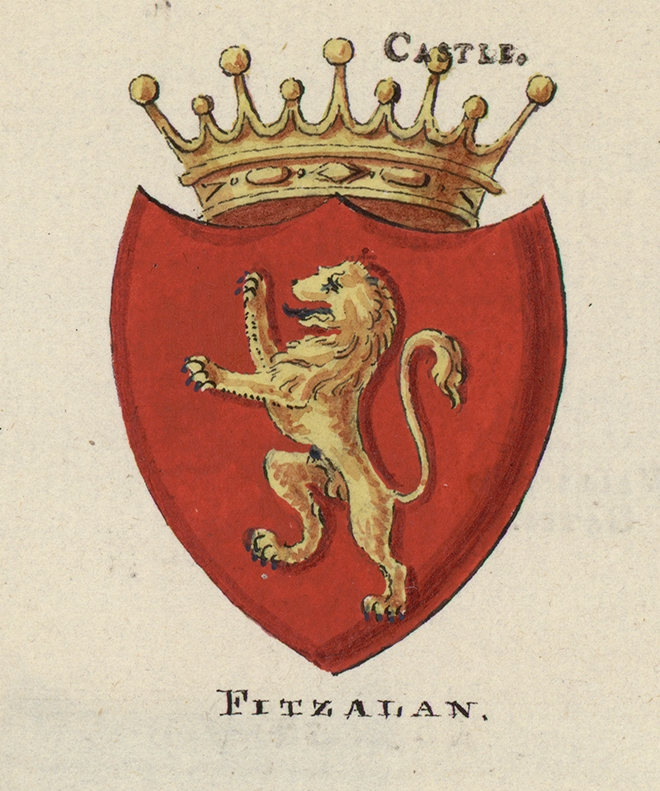
Coat of arms of the FitzAlan family

FitzAlan is an English patronymic surname of Anglo-Norman origin, descending from the knight Alan fitz Flaad (died 1120), who accompanied King Henry I to England on his succession. He was grandson of the Seneschal of the Bishop of Dol. The FitzAlan family shared a common patrilineal ancestry with the House of Stuart.

The FitzAlans held the Earldom of Arundel from 1267 to 1580.

Variants of this surname include Fitz-Alan, Fitzalan, Fitzallen, and Fitz Alan.

== Family members ==
Notable people with the surname FitzAlan include:

- Walter Fitz Alan (died 1177)
- William FitzAlan, Lord of Oswestry (1085–1160), an important Marcher lord and supporter of Empress Matilda, elder brother of Walter Fitz Alan.
- William Fitz Alan, 1st Lord of Oswestry and Clun (died 1210), son of William FitzAlan, Lord of Oswestry, and a Marcher lord under the early Plantagenet kings.
- William Fitz Alan, 2nd Lord of Oswestry and Clun (died 1215), son of William Fitz Alan, 1st Lord of Oswestry and Clun; he came into conflict with King John.
- John Fitzalan, 3rd Lord of Oswestry and Clun (1200–1240), son of William Fitz Alan, 1st Lord of Oswestry and Clun; he married into the d'Aubigny family, thus acquiring the Arundel earldom for the FitzAlans.
- John FitzAlan 6th Earl of Arundel (1223–1267)
- John FitzAlan, 7th Earl of Arundel (1246–1272)
- Richard FitzAlan, 1st or 8th Earl of Arundel (1267–1302)
- Edmund FitzAlan, 2nd or 9th Earl of Arundel (1285–1326) (forfeit 1326)
- Richard FitzAlan, 3rd or 10th Earl of Arundel (1313–1376) (restored 1331)
- Richard FitzAlan, 4th or 11th Earl of Arundel (1346–1397) (forfeit 1397)
- Thomas FitzAlan, 5th or 12th Earl of Arundel (1381–1415) (restored 1400)
- John FitzAlan, 6th or 13th Earl of Arundel (1385–1421)
- John FitzAlan, 7th or 14th Earl of Arundel (1408–1435)
- Humphrey FitzAlan, 8th or 15th Earl of Arundel (1429–1438)
- William FitzAlan, 9th or 16th Earl of Arundel (1417–1487)
- Thomas FitzAlan, 10th or 17th Earl of Arundel (1450–1524)
- William FitzAlan, 11th or 18th Earl of Arundel (1476–1544)
- Henry FitzAlan, 12th or 19th Earl of Arundel (1512–1580)
- Eleanor FitzAlan (ca. 1284 – ca. 1328)
- Bryan FitzAlan, Lord FitzAlan (died 1306)
- Lady Elizabeth FitzAlan (1366–1425)
- Thomas FitzAlan (died 1430), English knight

Henry Fitzalan-Howard, 14th Duke of Norfolk (1815–1860), the 13th Earl of Arundel of the Fourth Creation (1580), revived the use of the Fitzalan surname in the hyphenated form "Fitzalan-Howard". Edmund FitzAlan-Howard (1855–1947), son of the 14th Duke of Norfolk was raised up to the Peerage as "Viscount FitzAlan of Derwent" in 1921 when he was appointed Lord Lieutenant of Ireland. Lady Marcia Fitzalan-Howard (born 1953), daughter of the 17th Duke of Norfolk, uses the stage name Marsha Fitzalan as an actress.

== Origins ==
=== The controversy over Stewart ancestry ===
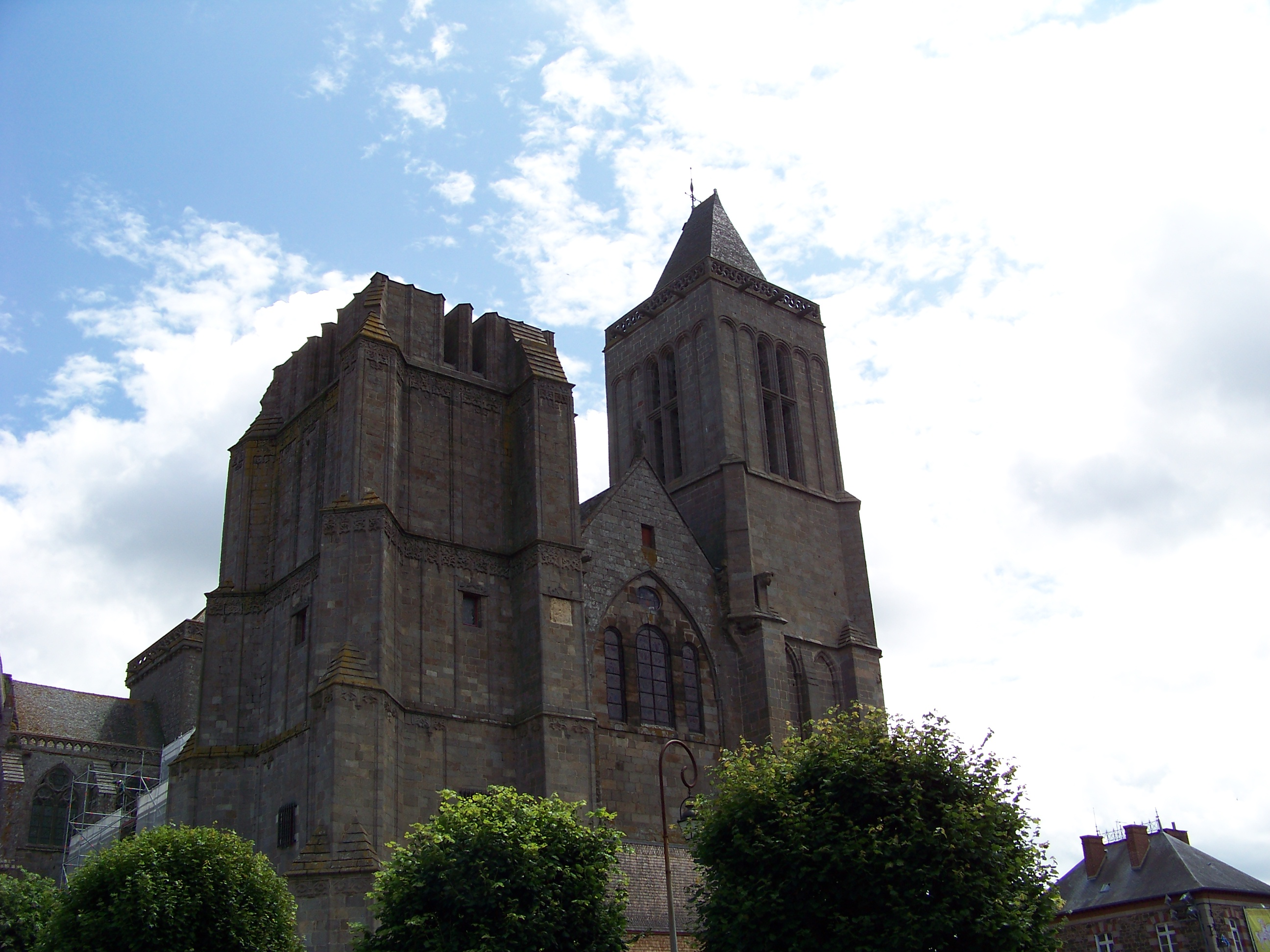
Dol Cathedral (Saint-Samson cathedral) in Dol, Brittany today. The present building was begun about a century after the time of Alan Fitz Flaad.

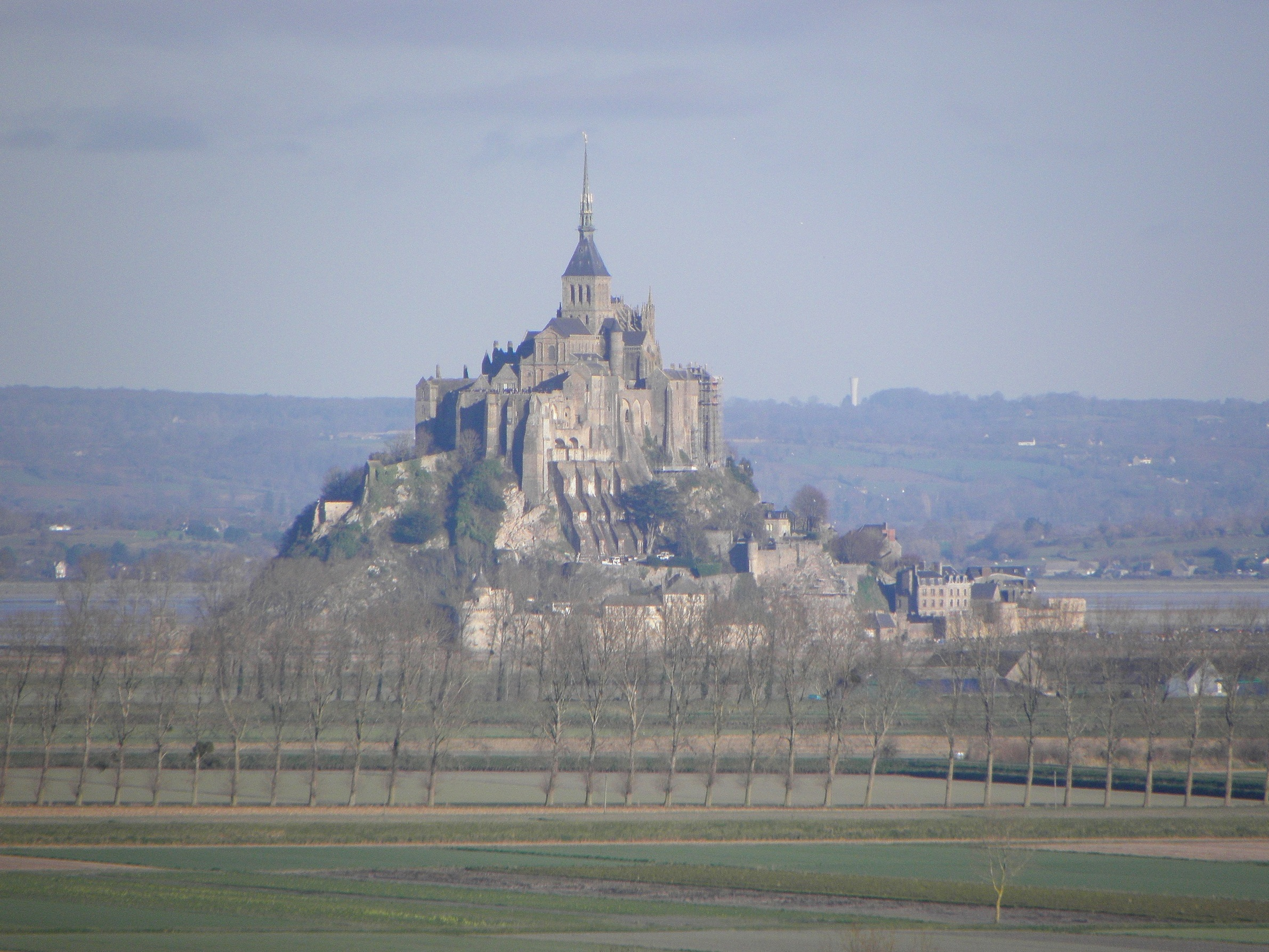
Mont St Michel, the isolated Breton monastery, on the Norman border, which Henry held against his brothers, William Rufus and Robert Curthose, in 1091

Alan's role was formerly obscure because of the political implications of examining the origins of the Stewart dynasty. Holinshed, deriving his information from the work of Hector Boece, asserted that Banquo, Thane of Lochaber, was the ancestor of the Stewarts. Distorting the role of Banquo, who is presented by Holinshed as Macbeth's chief accomplice in regicide, William Shakespeare presented him flatteringly in Macbeth as a martyred ancestor of James VI of Scotland and I of England. These legends, accepted as history, became part of the foundation narrative of the Stewarts and forced later writers to trace the Stewart ancestry through Fleance, Banquo's son. David Symson, the Historiographer Royal of Scotland, in a work dedicated to Queen Anne, followed the chroniclers in having Fleance marry a daughter of the Welsh ruler Gruffydd ap Llywelyn, and then introduced Walter as his son and Alan fitz Walter, 2nd High Steward of Scotland as his grandson. However, this greatly distorted the chronology, forcing Symson to transpose Alan Fitz Walter, actually born around 1140, to about 1073. This created a gap in the record, which was filled by multiplying the Alans and Walters in the Stewart line.

David Dalrymple, Lord Hailes, in his Annals of Scotland, published in the 1770s, went some way to establish a convincing chronology for Walter Fitz Alan, who, he asserted, belonged to the reign of David I of Scotland (1124–53) and his successor, Malcolm IV. Moreover, he was the first of the Stewarts: there were none in the reign of Malcolm III (1058–93), as Symson had been forced to maintain. He went on to demolish the legendary background to the Stewarts, which he described as "flattering and ignorant fictions". He showed that there was a need to distinguish the various Alans who were connected with the Stewart line, something he was unembarrassed to be unable to do:

Some of my readers may demand, "Who then was Alan the father of Walter, Stewart of Scotland in the reign of Malcolm IV?" ... In the reign of David I, before the middle of the twelfth century, the family of the Stewarts was opulent and powerful. It may, therefore, have subsisted for many ages previous to that time; but when, and what was its commencement, we cannot determine.

Andrew Stuart, a notable Scottish MP, accepted Dalrymple's critical work on the legendary ancestors, although he included among these a crusader Alan who was subsequently to emerge as genuine. He sought to establish a definite chronological framework, placing Walter Fitz Alan's death in 1177.

Not until the first decade of the 19th century did George Chalmers prove that Walter Fitz Alan, an acknowledged link in the Stewart ancestry, came from Shropshire and was the son of Alan Fitz Flaad. This finally established Alan Fitz Flaad's existence and importance and confirmed the kinship between the Stewarts and the FitzAlan Earls of Arundel. Even then, the legendary background took almost a century to fade. In 1858, Robert William Eyton, the distinguished historian of Shropshire, while clarifying Alan Fitz Flaad's connection with the county and details of his marriage, still tried to maintain a link with the legendary Banquo, and even surmised that Flaad was actually Fleance.

After an anonymous work of 1874 drew attention to a strong connection between Alan Fitz Flaad and Brittany, and confirmed Flaad's relationship to Alan the Seneschal, J. Horace Round definitively established and publicized Alan Fitz Flaad's true Breton origins in 1901 in a collection of genealogical essays. Alan's father, Flaad (rendered in numerous ways, including Flaald and Flathald), was a son (or possibly a brother) of Alain, dapifer to the Ancient Diocese of Dol, with its see at Dol-de-Bretagne, who had taken part in the First Crusade in 1097. "Alan Dapifer" is found as a witness in 1086 to a charter relating to Mezuoit, a cell near Dol of the Abbey of Saint-Florent de Saumur. The area of Dol is near Mont-Saint-Michel and has figured in the history of the Duchy of Brittany since at least the rule of Nominoe. Round's genealogy was confirmed in 1904 by Sir James Balfour Paul, then Lord Lyon King of Arms, who, in a definitive work, The Scots Peerage, stated that "the Stewarts or Stuarts are of Breton origin, descended from a family which held the office of Seneschal or Steward of Dol." He then reinstated Alan Fitz Flaad to his place in the ancestry of the Scottish royal family and gave a summary of what was known of his career.

=== Alan fitz Flaad: family tree ===
Round provided a family tree to embody his essential findings, which is adapted below.

Family of Alan fitz Flaad

Alan, Dapifer Dolensis (Seneschal or Steward of Dol)
Alan, Dapifer Dolensis, Took part in First Crusade, 1097.	Flaad; Occurs at Monmouth, 1101/2	Rhiwallon; Monk of St Florent
Alan Fitz Flaad, Founder of Sporle Priory
Jordan Fitz Alan, Dapifer in Brittany, Benefactor of Sele Priory	William Fitz Alan, Lord of Oswestry; Founder/benefactor of Haughmond Abbey, Died 1160	Walter Fitz Alan; Dapifer Regis Scotiae, Founder of Paisley Abbey, Died 1177
Alan Fitz Jordan, Dapifer Dolensis	William Fitz Alan II, Lord of Oswestry and Clun	Alan the Steward; Senescallus Regis Scotiae

== Family Tree ==
- Alan fitz Flaad
  - William FitzAlan, Lord of Oswestry
    - William Fitz Alan, 1st Lord of Oswestry and Clun
      - William Fitz Alan, 2nd Lord of Oswestry and Clun
      - John Fitzalan, Lord of Oswestry
        - John FitzAlan, 6th Earl of Arundel
          - House of FitzAlan
  - Jordan fitz Alan, Seneschal of Dol
  - Walter fitz Alan, 1st High Steward of Scotland
    - Alan fitz Walter, 2nd High Steward of Scotland
      - Walter Stewart, 3rd High Steward of Scotland
        - Alexander Stewart, 4th High Steward of Scotland
          - James Stewart, 5th High Steward of Scotland
            - Walter Stewart, 6th High Steward of Scotland
              - Robert II of Scotland
              - John Stewart of Ralston
          - John Stewart of Bonkyll
            - Alexander Stewart of Bonkyll
              - Earls of Angus (extinct 1361)
            - Alan Stewart of Dreghorn
              - Stewart of Darnley
                - Earls of Lennox
                - Stewart of Garlies
                  - Earls of Galloway
                  - Stewart of Burray
                  - Stewart of Physgill (Phisgal)
                  - Stewart of Minto
                    - Lords Blantyre
                  - Stewart of Tongrie
                  - Stewart of Barclye
            - Walter Stewart of Garlies and Dalswinton
              - John Stewart of Dalswinton
                - Walter Stewart of Garlies and Dalswinton
            - James Stewart of Pearston
              - Stewart of Pearston
                - Stewart of Lorn
                  - Clan Stewart of Appin
                - Earls of Atholl
                - Earls of Buchan
                  - Earls of Traquair (illegitimate)
            - John Stewart of Daldon
            - Robert Stewart of Daldowie
        - Walter Bailloch
          - Earls of Menteith
        - Robert Stewart, Lord of Darnley
  - Simon fitz Alan
    - Clan Boyd

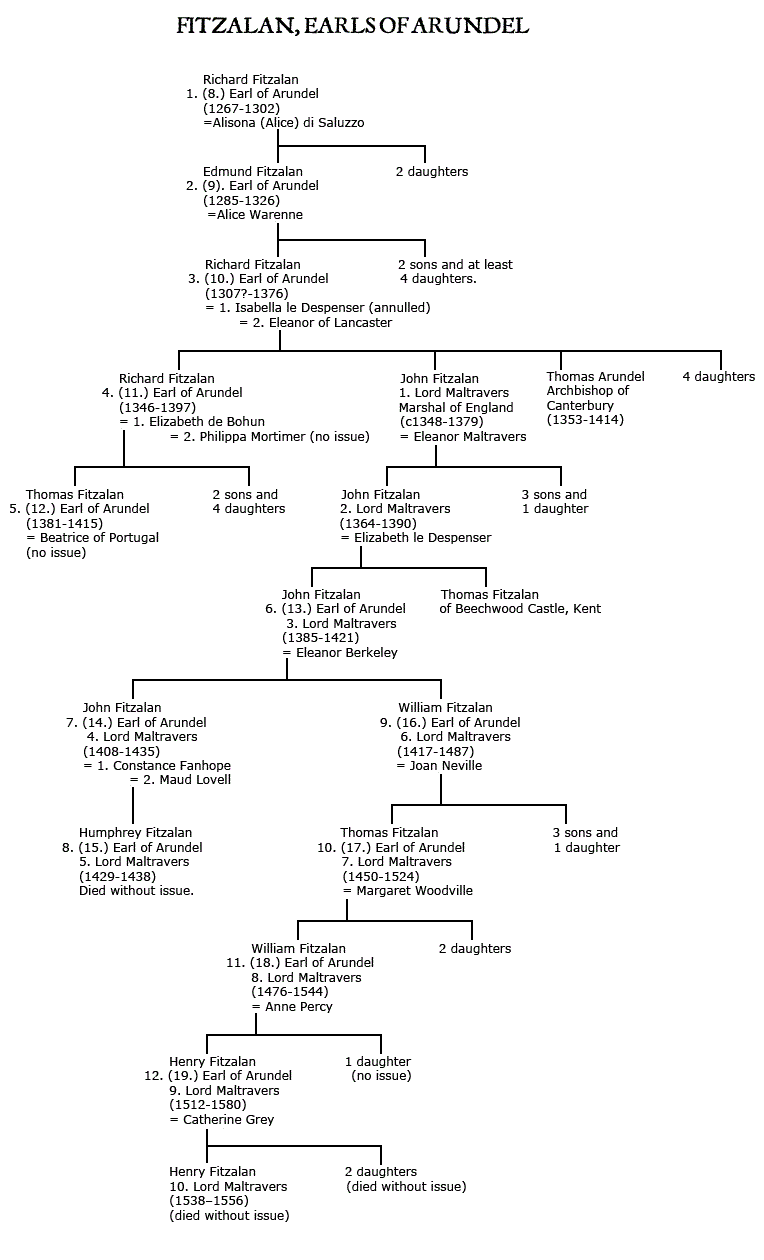
family tree of FitzAlan family, earls of Arundel

== Armorial ==
See also: Category: FitzAlan arms

Figure
Name of Noble and blazon
John FitzAlan (died 1267), 6th Earl of Arundel

Gules, lion rampant or

Richard FitzAlan (1306–1376 at Arundel Castle in Sussex), 10th Earl of Arundel

Quarterly: 1st and 4th: gules, lion passant or; 2nd and 3rd, chequy azure and or (Warenne).

John FitzAlan (1365–1391), Lord Maltravers

Quarterly: 1st and 4th, gules, a lion rampant or; 2nd and 3rd: fretty sable and or

Thomas FitzAlan (died 1524), 10th Earl of Arundel

Quarterly: 1st and 4th, gules a lion rampant or, 2nd and 3rd: sable a fret or.
