= William FitzAlan =

William FitzAlan may refer to:

- William FitzAlan, Lord of Oswestry (died 1160)
- William FitzAlan, 1st Lord of Oswestry and Clun (died 1210), son of the above
- William FitzAlan, 2nd Lord of Oswestry and Clun (died 1215)
- William Fitzalan, 9th Earl of Arundel (1417–1487), descendant of the FitzAlans of Oswestry
- William Fitzalan, 11th Earl of Arundel (1476–1544)
