= Ernulf de Hesdin =

French knight (d. c. 1097)

- Born: Unknown; Probably Hesdin
- Died: 1097-8; Antioch
- Occupations: Medieval soldier and landholder.
- Years active: c. 1066–1097

Ernulf de Hesdin (died 1097), also transcribed as Arnulf and Ernulphe, was a French knight who took part in the Norman Conquest of England and became a major landholder under William the Conqueror and William Rufus, featuring prominently in the Domesday Book. He was disgraced as a suspected rebel and died while taking part in the First Crusade as part of the army of Robert Curthose.

== Origins ==
As his sobriquet implies, Ernulf was probably born in the first half of the 11th century in the County of Hesdin, historically part of Picardy or Artois and centred at that time on Vieil-Hesdin, then a flourishing fortified town known as Hesdin on the bank of the Canche river, about 6 km from modern Hesdin. His family were minor landholders, vassals of the Counts of Hesdin, whose overlord was the Count of Flanders, through acquisition by marriage of the County of Artois circa 898.

The first Count of Hesdin who is definitely known through chronicles was Alulf I, who flourished around 1000. Around the middle of the century, there was another count of the same name, known as Alulf II, and he was followed by Walter I, who was contemporary with the Norman conquest of England and was noted for his piety. Walter's successor, Engelram, was count from 1072 to 1100. Engelram and his wife, Matilda, emulated and continued the work of Walter and immediately set about rebuilding the monastery at Auchy-lès-Hesdin, which had been destroyed by the Normans. They made it a priory of the Abbey of Saint Bertin at Saint-Omer. Ernulf must have come to maturity under the rule of Walter I but he had close links with Engelram and they appear at a number of points as allies and as benefactors of religious establishments.

Little is known of Ernulf's family, except that he had a brother called Ilbod, who is listed in Domesday as an important landholder in Essex and Oxfordshire.

== Career ==
=== An enigmatic figure ===
Considerable interest developed in Ernulf after Robert William Eyton, a pioneering historian of Shropshire, showed in the 1850s that, through the marriage of his daughter, Avelina, to Alan fitz Flaad, Ernulf was an ancestor of the Stewart Kings of Scotland as well as the FitzAlan, Earls of Arundel. A letter to the Herald and Genealogist journal in 1866 then posed the question: "Who was Arnulph de Hesding?" However, the author then ably summarised what had become known of Ernulf's property holdings and offspring without adding anything to the biography. In a reply, Eyton himself opened up more areas for genealogical research but, as he confessed at the outset, did not try to answer the question posed. Henry Barkly remarked in 1888 that "despite all researches, Ernulph de Hesding still remains one of the most mysterious personages in Domesday." This remains true. A great deal is known of Ernulf's landholdings, including details of some of his numerous benefactions to monasteries, but biographical detail is absent, and an outline of his life has to be guessed from other information and legend.

=== Early career ===
Little certain is known of Ernulf's early career. The idea that he was part of William the Conqueror's invasion force goes back several centuries. In 1791 Collinson's History of Somerset quoted the Domesday entry for Weston, near Bath, then stated:

"When this Ernulf de Hesding, who was one of the Conqueror's attendants, died, or how he parted with his estate, does not appear; but about the latter end of the reign of king William Rufus, these hides in Weston are found to be the property of Patrick de Cadurcis, or Chaworth...."

Although the property details are scrupulously cited, the author produced no authority for his biographical assertion. Ernulf is listed as a companion of William the Conqueror (see companions of William the Conqueror) in the late-19th-century version of the Battle Abbey Roll posted by Léopold Victor Delisle in the church at Dives-sur-Mer, where he is called Arnoul de Hesdin. However, the list has no authority, being a collation of lists from a tradition that was not even claimed to stem from Battle Abbey until the 16th century. It is likely Arnulf served William the Conqueror with some distinction at some stage during the Norman conquest of England, as it would otherwise be difficult to account for his great wealth and power at the time of Domesday Book. It is plausible, but unproven, that this included the Battle of Hastings. The Liber Monasterii de Hyda, the chronicle and cartulary of Hyde Abbey, was to describe him in later life as statura procerus, industria summus, possessionibus suffultus—"tall in stature, outstanding in activity, well-supported by possessions"—which accords with a successful military career. The Domesday survey found Ernulf a tenant-in-chief in ten counties and lord of other estates under other great tenants-in-chief. However, there is no direct evidence of what won him such fortune. It is known that he sometimes attended court. In 1081 his gift of an estate to Gloucester Abbey was witnessed at Salisbury by the Conqueror himself, Queen Matilda, Princes Robert and Henry, the two archbishops, two further bishops, and other dignitaries: signalling great prestige.

=== With Rufus ===
Ernulf's good fortune continued into the reign of William Rufus (1089–1100). He seems to have been at the royal court on occasion and is recorded as a witness to important royal charters. On 27 January 1091 at Dover he witnessed the king's confirmation of John of Tours as the first Bishop of Bath and Wells. Probably later that year he was at Hastings to witness royal confirmation of St Osmund's establishment of Salisbury Cathedral as a collegiate church of secular clergy.

=== The Normandy Campaign ===
Ernulf was involved in the king's attempts to conquer Normandy, which was largely under the rule of the Conqueror's eldest son, Robert Curthose. In 1093 William negotiated with Robert I, Count of Flanders, Ernulf's overlord, in preparation for a military expedition to Normandy. Robert was sympathetic, as he had long preferred an English alliance to facing the threat of a powerful Normandy. However, he died shortly afterwards, and was succeeded by his son, Robert II, who was less inclined to offer practical support. Engelram and his vassals, including Ernulf, mobilised for war and it seems that part of their preparations involved religious donations, primarily to the Priory of St George, very near Hesdin. Count Robert gladly agreed to guarantee these gifts during the coming conflict and permitted the priory to be made subject to Anchin Abbey. William's invasion fleet was delayed until March 1094 and his campaign was then stalled by the intervention of King Philip I of France on the side of Robert Curthose. William bought off Philip but by the autumn, hostilities had petered out inconclusively. Threatened by the appearance of his brother Henry in England, William made for home. Ernulf accompanied him on the return journey, stopping at Hesdin. There he confirmed and perhaps extended his grants to the Prior of St George, including all the fiefs he held under Engelram at Hesdin.

=== A final crisis? ===
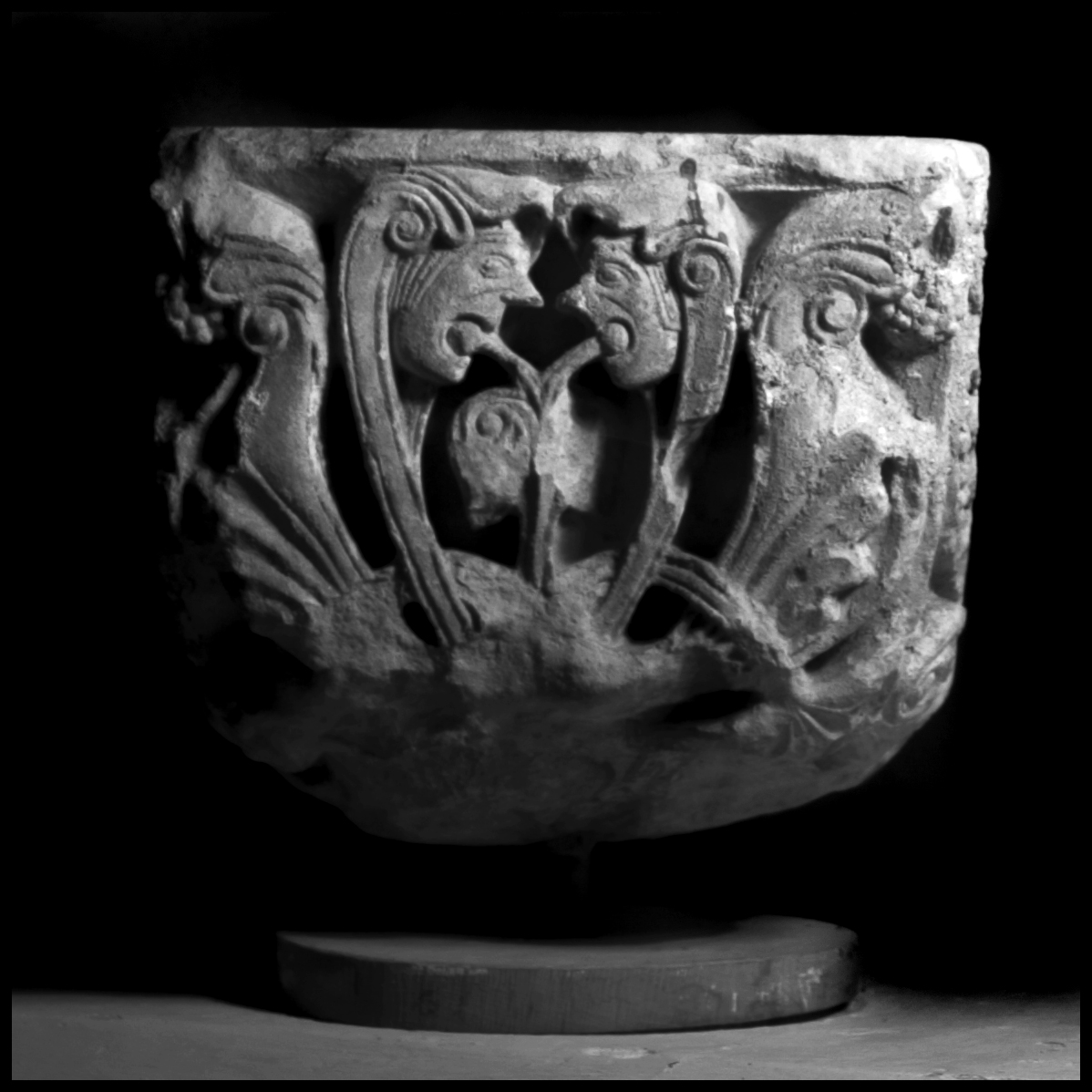
Carved Romanesque capital from Hyde Abbey, which preserved information about Ernulf after his death, although it pursued property disputes against him in life

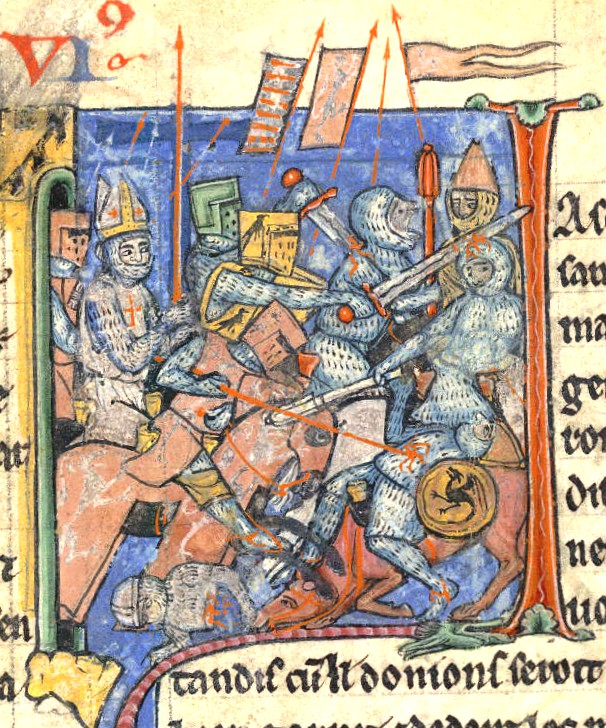
13th-century depiction of fighting outside Antioch from William of Tyre's Histoire d'Outremer

In 1095 the king was challenged by a baronial revolt, initiated by Robert de Mowbray, the Earl of Northumbria. The revolt was not widely supported and was over by the end of the year. However, Ernulf was one of those accused of involvement in the plot—unjustly according to the Hyde chronicle. The main group of participants were brought to trial by combat at Salisbury in January 1097 and some received brutal justice, William II, Count of Eu, being castrated and blinded.

According to the semi-legendary account of the Liber de Hyda, Ernulf was represented in the ordeal by his own champion who defeated the king's representative. However, Ernulf was so disgusted at the accusation that he renounced all his lands in England and left the country for ever. Later that year Ernulf enlisted in the First Crusade and met his end during the Siege of Antioch. Facing death, he refused the aid of a doctor, saying: "No doctor can reach me except he for whom I have undertaken this pilgrimage."

== Landholder ==
Although Ernulf's lands, like those of the great territorial magnates, were widely dispersed, a distribution maps show a marked concentration running south west along the Cotswolds, through Oxfordshire and Gloucestershire, then continuing to the Mendip Hills in Somerset and across to central Wiltshire. This gave him a significant presence at both ends of the medieval English wool trade.

Some of the estates where Ernulf claimed to be tenant-in-chief were disputed. Notably, he was in contention with the Church over at least two holdings. At Pewsey, where he retained the land himself, his land was claimed by Hyde Abbey. At Potterne, where he sublet, the Osmund, the Bishop of Salisbury, was the claimant. In each case the land had been held by a vassal of the ecclesiastical authorities before 1066, but either some subsequent tenant or Ernulf himself had contrived to separate it and present it as held directly from the king. At Malmesbury there seems to have been some dispute with the king himself, as Ernulf was said to have accepted his messuage there "incautiously".

The following tables were extracted from the raw data for Open Domesday at the University of Hull website. The reference numbers represent the Phillimore number with a county prefix, giving a unique alphanumeric reference for each holding. The T. R. E. or Tempore Regis Eduardi values represent the Domesday estimate of an estates worth "in the time of King Edward", that is on the eve of the Norman conquest. All values are converted into pounds, with fractions decimalised.

=== Tenant-in-chief and manorial lord ===
Domesday found Ernulf with about 52 holdings as tenant-in-chief and just under half of these he retained also as lord. These included the important manors of Chipping Norton, where he seems to have built a motte and bailey castle at Chipping Norton, subsequently replaced by his FitzAlan descendants with a more substantial stronghold. The value of these estates varied greatly, although some were apparently the focus of considerable development. Newbury, Berkshire was an embryonic commercial centre and had risen greatly in value since 1066. However, agriculture could produce very good returns and some rural settlements were large. Kempsford in Gloucestershire incorporated in its very high value of £66 6s. 8d. seven Gloucester burgesses, but the bulk of the income came from the 62 village households and agricultural resources, including four mills, ample pasture and dairying, which produced sheep's cheese. However, Ruislip, not far from the capital had seen a fall in value since 1066, although its 53 households included four French colonists, possibly among Ernulf's own retainers, and its woodland provided food for 1,500 pigs.

Lands held by Ernulf de Hesdin as both tenant-in-chief and manorial lord
Reference no.	Manor	Domesday County	Value T. R. E.	Value 1086	Location
HAM 26,1	Combe	Hampshire	£6.00	£6.00	51°20′44″N 1°28′10″W
BRK 50,1	Newbury	Berkshire	£9.00	£24.00	51°24′09″N 1°19′28″W
WIL 10,3 WIL 25,6	Pewsey	Wiltshire		£2.00	51°20′29″N 1°46′03″W
WIL 25,1	Keevil	Wiltshire		£26.00	51°19′19″N 2°06′59″W
WIL 25,8	Chalfield	Wiltshire	£4.00	£2.50	51°22′03″N 2°12′08″W
WIL 25,9	Chalfield	Wiltshire		£2.50	51°22′12″N 2°12′50″W
WIL 25,10	Buttermere	Wiltshire			51°20′53″N 1°30′42″W
WIL 25,16	Cholderton	Wiltshire	£1.25	£2.00	51°10′46″N 1°40′43″W
WIL 25,20	Chedglow	Wiltshire		£1.00	51°38′09″N 2°05′08″W
WIL 25,26	Easton Piercy	Wiltshire	£3.00	£5.00	51°29′55″N 2°09′57″W
DOR 32,3	Kingcombe	Dorset		£0.50	50°47′50″N 2°38′41″W
DOR 32,4	Poorton	Dorset		£0.63	50°46′51″N 2°41′00″W
DOR 32,5	Mapperton	Dorset	£2.00	£3.00	50°47′41″N 2°42′22″W
SOM 41,1	Weston	Somerset	£8.00	£8.00	51°23′46″N 2°23′30″W
MDX 10,1	Ruislip	Middlesex	£30.00	£20.00	51°34′34″N 0°25′59″W
OXF 40,3	Chipping Norton	Oxfordshire	£16.00	£22.00	51°56′N 1°33′W
GLS 60,1	Kempsford	Gloucestershire	£30.00	£66.33	51°40′08″N 1°46′12″W
GLS 60,2	Hatherop	Gloucestershire	£8.00	£12.00	51°44′42″N 1°46′34″W
GLS 60,3	Ampney St Nicholas	Gloucestershire	£6.00	£6.00	51°42′33″N 1°53′02″W
GLS 60,4	Oldbury-on-the-Hill	Gloucestershire	£10.00	£10.00	51°35′28″N 2°15′55″W
GLS 60,5	Badminton	Gloucestershire	£10.00	£10.00	51°32′35″N 2°17′06″W
GLS 60,6	Acton Turville	Gloucestershire	£5.00	£5.00	51°31′34″N 2°16′34″W
BDF 20,1	Toddington	Bedfordshire	£30.00	£25.00	51°57′N 0°32′W
BDF 20,2	Chalgrave	Bedfordshire	£0.10	£0.10	51°56′06″N 0°31′20″W

=== Tenant-in-chief but subinfeudated ===
At Domesday Ernulf was subinfeudating 28 estates to other landholders. Some of these were of French, probably Norman, origin, like the Robert who held five of his Wiltshire estates, probably forming a fairly compact portfolio. Others were of Anglo-Saxon or Norse origin, like Estrild, the widow of the former sheriff, and Thorkil—both also Wiltshire tenants.

Lands held by Ernulf de Hesdin as tenant-in-chief but subinfeudated
Reference no.	Manor	Domesday County	Manorial lord	Value T. R. E.	Value 1086	Location
WIL 25,2	Potterne	Wiltshire	Robert	£4.00	£5.00	51°19′36″N 2°00′29″W
WIL 25,3	Little Cheverell	Wiltshire	Lethelin	£3.00	£5.00	51°16′56″N 2°00′58″W
WIL 25,4	Etchilhampton	Wiltshire	Estrild, wife of Edric, the former Sheriff	£2.00	£2.00	51°20′31″N 1°56′06″W
WIL 25,5	Calstone Wellington	Wiltshire	Estrild, wife of Edric, the former Sheriff	£2.00	£2.00	51°24′54″N 1°57′59″W
WIL 25,7	Standen	Wiltshire	Benzelin the Archdeacon		£2.00	51°17′00″N 1°33′33″W
WIL 25,11	Clyffe Pypard	Wiltshire	Robert	£1.50	£2.00	51°29′29″N 1°53′43″W
WIL 25,12	Bichenhilde	Wiltshire	Robert	£0.50	£0.75	51°27′53″N 1°59′27″W
WIL 25,13	Witcomb	Wiltshire	Robert	£1.00	£1.50	51°28′50″N 1°57′55″W
WIL 25,14	Hilmarton	Wiltshire	Robert	£0.75	£1.50	51°28′33″N 1°58′15″W
WIL 25,15	Cholderton	Wiltshire	Wulfward White	£1.25	£2.00	51°10′39″N 1°40′57″W
WIL 25,17	Cholderton	Wiltshire	Godric	£1.00	£2.00	51°10′58″N 1°40′44″W
WIL 25,18	Bechenhilde	Wiltshire	Robert	£0.50	£0.75	51°27′57″N 1°59′57″W
WIL 25,19	Chenebuild	Wiltshire	Urso	£1.00	£1.25	Unknown
WIL 25,21	Chedglow	Wiltshire	A thegn	£0.75	£0.16	51°38′14″N 2°05′00″W
WIL 25,22	Deverill	Wiltshire	Urso	£1.50	£2.50	51°09′54″N 2°11′13″W
WIL 25,23	Upton Scudamore	Wiltshire	Reinbald of Upton		£2.00	51°13′50″N 2°11′37″W
WIL 25,24	Winterbourne in Berwick St James	Wiltshire	Nubold	£1.00	£2.00	51°09′04″N 1°54′05″W
WIL 25,25	Hardenhuish	Wiltshire	Thorkil	£4.00	£2.00	51°28′17″N 2°07′53″W
WIL 25,27	Yatton Keynell	Wiltshire	Judicael the priest	£1.50	£2.50	51°29′09″N 2°11′51″W
DOR 32,1	Kington Magna and Little Kington	Dorset	Urso		£4.00	51°00′26″N 2°19′51″W
DOR 32,2	Melbury Bubb and Melbury Osmond	Dorset	Urso	£2.00	£4.00	50°51′12″N 2°36′10″W
SOM 41,2	Tickenham	Somerset	Engelhere		£2.00	51°26′25″N 2°46′55″W
SOM 41,3	Rodden	Somerset	Ingelrann	£4.00	£4.00	51°13′36″N 2°17′37″W
MDX 10,2	Kingsbury	Middlesex	Albold	£6.00	£4.00	51°34′57″N 0°16′27″W
OXF 40,1	Black Bourton	Oxfordshire	Wimund of Tessel		£4.00	51°43′59″N 1°35′24″W
OXF 40,2	Ludwell	Oxfordshire	Osmund	£0.75	£2.00	51°53′54″N 1°22′22″W
GLS 60,7	Hanham	Gloucestershire	Hunbald	£2.00	£2.00	51°26′59″N 2°30′59″W
HUN 18,1	Offord Cluny	Huntingdonshire	Cluny Abbey	£10.00	£10.00	52°17′N 0°13′W

=== Manorial lord and vassal ===
Ernulf also held estates as a tenant and vassal, but only of the very greatest landholders, including Odo, Earl of Kent, who was the Bishop of Bayeux and the king's estranged half-brother. Such landholdings created a reciprocal personal bond between himself and these other magnates, and this political advantage may explain the majority of the transactions. Only two, Chelsfield and Barton Hartshorn, were of much economic value.

Lands held by Ernulf de Hesdin as vassal of a tenant-in-chief
Reference no.	Manor	Domesday County	Tenant-in-Chief	Value T. R. E.	Value 1086	Location
KEN 5,15	Farningham	Kent	Odo, Bishop of Bayeux	£3.00	£6.00	51°22′50″N 0°13′18″E
KEN 5,24	Chelsfield	Kent	Odo, Bishop of Bayeux	£16.00	£25.00	51°21′26″N 0°07′43″E
KEN 5,110	Cliffe	Kent	Odo, Bishop of Bayeux	£1.50	£1.50	51°27′43″N 0°29′52″E
KEN 5,111	Haven	Kent	Odo, Bishop of Bayeux	£2.50	£3.00	51°25′09″N 0°30′14″E
WIL 25,23	Upton Scudamore	Wiltshire	William of Eu			51°13′50″N 2°11′37″W
MDX 9,4	Greenford	Middlesex	Geoffrey de Mandeville	£2.00	£1.00	51°31′39″N 0°21′09″W
BUK 4,34	Lenborough	Buckinghamshire	Odo, Bishop of Bayeux	£3.00	£4.00	51°58′41″N 0°59′02″W
BUK 4,37	Barton Hartshorn	Buckinghamshire	Odo, Bishop of Bayeux	£3.00	£14.00	51°58′23″N 1°04′08″W
STS 11,34	Weston Coyney	Staffordshire	Robert de Stafford		£0.50	52°59′32″N 2°05′55″W
STS 11,36	Caverswall	Staffordshire	Robert of Stafford		£1.50	52°59′00″N 2°04′28″W

=== Urban holdings ===
Ernulf was recorded as holder of substantial urban property. He had seven houses at Gloucester and no less than 51 household sites at Newbury, his own manor. Here the value of the manor had risen from only £9 at the time of Edward the Confessor to £24 at Domesday, which seems to be connected with the growth of the town as a centre of trade under Ernulf's control.

Urban houses and sites held by Ernulf de Hesdin
Reference no.	Town	County	No. of holdings	Location
WIL M16	Malmesbury	Wiltshire	1	51°35′02″N 2°05′56″W
SOM 41,2	Bath	Somerset	3	51°23′N 2°22′W
BUK B10	Buckingham	Buckinghamshire	1	51°59′44″N 0°59′12″W
OXF B9	Oxford	Oxfordshire	3	51°45′07″N 1°15′28″W
GLS 60,1	Gloucester	Gloucestershire	7	51°52′N 2°14′W
BRK 50,1	Newbury	Berkshire	51	51°23′55″N 1°19′26″W

=== A lost inheritance? ===
Barkly, commenting on the account of Ernulf's last year in the Liber de Hyda, points out: "This entire renunciation of his lands, however, can hardly be reconciled with the known facts." However, he did accept that the descent of Ernulf's lands is not fully understood. Emmelina, his wife, and Avelina, his daughter, continued to confirm his grants and, thirty years after his death, his son and namesake still held some of the same manors. A substantial proportion of his estates passed to Patrick de Cadurcis, possibly his son-in-law. There are doubts about exactly how Patrick de Cadurcis came into the picture and whether his wife, Matilda, really was Ernulf's daughter. The Shropshire historian, Robert William Eyton points out that:

The various fees in Gloucestershire, Wiltshire, and elsewhere, which formed the Domesday Barony of Emulf de Hesding, are found in 1165 to be divided among coparceners. A third of this fief, or thereabouts, was then vested in the representatives of Alan Fitz Flaald.

These FitzAlan lands were inherited from Ernulf through his daughter, Avelina. It is not impossible that some of his lands were seized by William Rufus and later restored. Despite some outstanding issues, however, it seems that a large proportion of Ernulf's estates passed through the normal channels of inheritance and it is unlikely his family were ever left landless by a grand gesture.

== Religious benefactions ==
Ernulf was generous in his grants to a number of Benedictine monasteries. When in 1080 William I confirmed a number of his own gifts to Preaux Abbey in the Diocese of Lisieux, he used the opportunity to confirm grants by some of his barons. Ernulf had donated the church at Newbury, together with the priest's house, a hide of land and the tithes. On 2 February 1081 Ernulf gave the manor of Linkenholt to Gloucester Abbey, witnessed by the king, queen, two princes and church hierarchy. The manor was duly recorded as belonging to Gloucester Abbey, and Ernulf's grant attested again, in Domesday Book.

When in 1094 Enulf confirmed the grant of his estates at Hesdin to St George's priory, he crossed the Channel and went to Chipping Norton, where he confirmed a series of further gifts to the priory. These included the churches at Chipping Norton, Weston, near Bath, and Easton Piercy near Kington St Michael, as well as two chapels in Bath. At Newbury he gave a curtilage, which the priest was to hold for an annual payment of half a mark of gold to the priory, although it would pass to the priory in its entirety on his death.

To Cluny Abbey, which had been the monastery most closely associated with the Gregorian Reform movement, Ernulf gave three manors: Tixover, Manton and Offord. These were confirmed by Henry I about 1131.

== Marriage and family ==
Ernulf's wife was called Emmelina, a diminutive form of Emma, as is confirmed by numerous grants they made together to monasteries, for example the grant of the manor of Combe in Hampshire to Bec Abbey.

=== Issue ===
There is still some doubt about the children of Ernulf and Emmelina.

- Ernulf de Hesdin, a son and namesake, was one of Ernulf senior's heirs. He was hanged on the orders of King Stephen in 1138, after he and his nephew, William FitzAlan, held Shrewsbury for Empress Matilda in the opening stages of the Anarchy.

- William is named, along with his sister Ava, as consenting to Ernulf's gifts to St George's Priory at Hesdin. He may have inherited estates in France. He was still alive in 1125 as he was named in that year as witness to a grant that Henry I made to Cluny Abbey.

- Avelina, known to be in this case a diminutive of Ava, married Alan fitz Flaad, a Breton adventurer who became an important landholder through the favour of Henry I. Alan's wife was long held to be the daughter of Warin, an earlier Norman Sheriff of Shropshire, but Avelina's existence and significance were proved by Eyton, whose work was validated by J. Horace Round. Avelina's second husband was Robert fitz Walter of Horsham, Sheriff of Norfolk and Suffolk, as shown in a grant, dated no earlier than 1126, of their church at Chipping Norton to Gloucester Abbey. Two sons of Avelina and Alan are noted for their dynastic importance.

- William FitzAlan was heir to Alan's lands in England and from him were descended the FitzAlan Earls of Arundel.

- Walter fitz Alan became 1st hereditary High Steward of Scotland and ancestor of the House of Stuart who became the reigning dynasty first of Scotland and later of England and Ireland too.

- Matilda married Patrick de Cadurcis, Anglicised as Chaworth. His family was traced to a castle near Le Mans by Round, who remained doubtful whether Matilda really was a daughter of Ernulf and Emmelina. However, the couple inherited a substantial part of Ernulf's Domesday estates. Round's comments were followed soon after by the discovery of stronger evidence by Barkley. In the early 12th century the couple gave a church at Toddington, Bedfordshire to the Abbey of St Pierre de la Couture. They named Ernulf de Hesdin as one of the spiritual beneficiaries, but referred to him as one who held their estates before them, rather than specifying him as Matilda's father.
