= Alan fitz Flaad =

11th-century Breton knight

- Born: c. 1060; Probably at Dol-de-Bretagne
- Died: after 1120
- Occupations: Medieval soldier and landowner Sheriff of Shropshire
- Years active: c. 1090 – c. 1120
- Known for: Progenitor of Stewart Kings of Scotland and FitzAlan Earls of Arundel

Alan fitz Flaad (c. 1060 – after 1120) was a Breton knight, probably recruited as a mercenary by Henry I of England in his conflicts with his brothers. After Henry became King of England, Alan became an assiduous courtier and obtained large estates in Norfolk, Sussex, Shropshire, and elsewhere in the Midlands, including the feudal barony and castle of Oswestry in Shropshire. His duties included supervision of the Welsh border. He is now noted as the progenitor of the FitzAlan family, the Earls of Arundel (1267–1580), and the House of Stuart, although his family connections were long a matter of conjecture and controversy.

== Career ==
=== Arrival in England ===
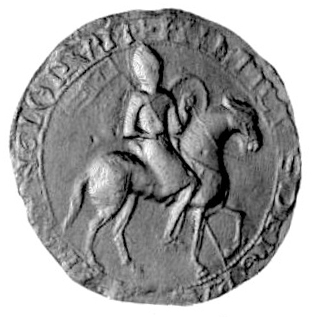
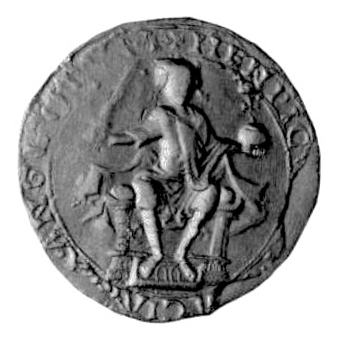
Henry's royal seal, showing the King on horseback and seated on his throne. The images reflect Henry's dual status as duke (of Normandy) and king.

Flaad and his son Alan had come to the favourable notice of King Henry I of England who, soon after his accession, brought Flaad and Alan to England. Eyton, consistently following the theory of the Scottish origins of the Stewarts, thought this was because he was part of the entourage of the Queen, Matilda of Scotland; Round pointed out that Henry had been besieged in Mont-Saint-Michel during his struggle with his brothers, an event which probably occurred in 1091. He is known to have recruited Breton troops at that time and, after his surrender, left the scene via the adjoining regions of Brittany, where Dol is situated. This is a likely explanation for the Bretons in the military retinue he brought to England after the death of William Rufus.

Alan's career in England can be traced largely through his presence as a witness to charters granted by the king during his travels in the first decade or more of his reign. Some of his activities were traced by Eyton, and his researches overlap with William Farrer's calendar of Henry I's travels. All of the business in which he took part was ecclesiastical, involving grants, sometimes disputed, to churches and monasteries.

=== Appearances at court ===
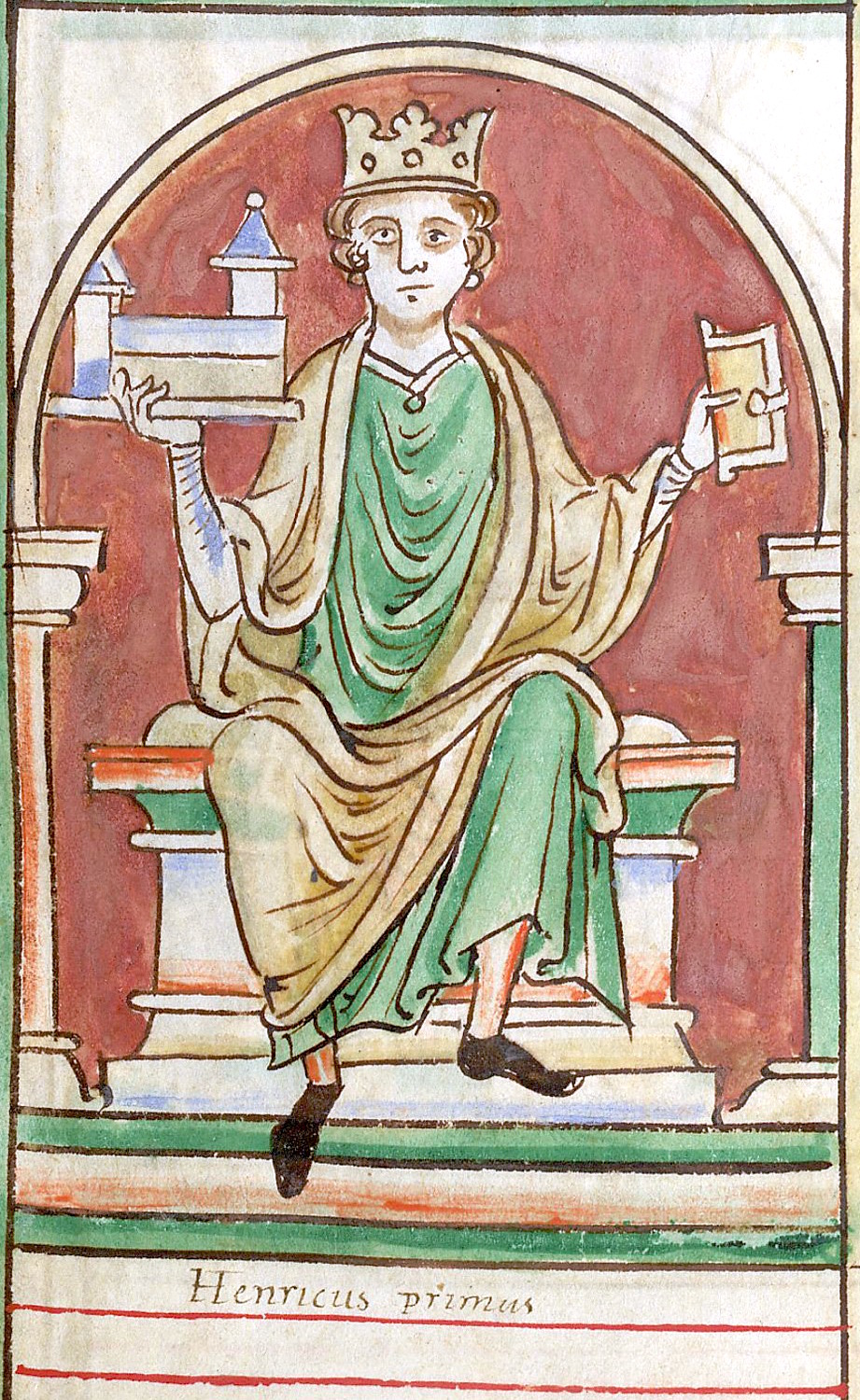
Miniature from illuminated Chronicle of Matthew Paris, showing Henry enthroned and symbolically holding a church. Alan fitz Flaad's business at court seems invariably to have involved donations to the church.

Alan appeared in Henry I's company at least as early as September 1101, probably at a court held in Windsor Castle, when he witnessed important grants to Norwich Cathedral, confirming its foundation and various endowments. Next, he appeared with the king at Canterbury in 1103, where he witnessed the grant of a market to the nuns of Malling Abbey and land acquisitions by Rochester Cathedral, then in the process of rebuilding.

Later that year, or early in the next, Alan was with the king in the New Forest, where the business concerned Andover Priory, a daughter house of the great Benedictine Abbey of Saint-Florent de Saumur. He was probably selected deliberately for this meeting because of his family's close connections with Saumur Abbey: one of his uncles was a monk there. William Rufus had decreed that all chapels in the parish of Andover church should be handed over to the monks or destroyed. One problem at issue revolved around the Foxcote chapel, which was evidently being defended from destruction or annexation by Edward de Foscote, a local landowner. Another seems to have been the administration of justice in the monastic estates. Wihenoc, a monk of St Florent, had initiated an action against the reeve of Andover to have these issues clarified and resolved. Alan Fitz Flaad was called upon to witness a compromise, although Foxcote was among the properties confirmed to the priory by Pope Eugenius III in 1146.

In the autumn of 1105, Alan was called to York to witness confirmation of Ralph Paynel's transfer of his refounded Holy Trinity Priory in York to Marmoutier Abbey, Tours and his many endowments of the priory itself. At some point, he also witnessed Roger de Nonant's gift of the church at Totnes and various tithes to the Abbey of Ss Sergius and Bacchus at Angers, a gift earmarked as being for the souls of the royal family.

In May 1110, Alan was at court at Windsor again to witness the king's settlement of a property dispute between Hervey le Breton, Bishop of Ely, and Ranulph Flambard, Bishop of Durham, resolved in favour of the former.

Probably only later did he appear as a witness to a royal command issued to Richard de Belmeis I, the Bishop of London and the king's viceroy in Shropshire, to see that justice was done in the case of a disputed prebend at Morville. The collegiate church there had been dissolved and replaced with a priory attached to Shrewsbury Abbey and it seems that the son of one of the prebendaries was resisting the loss of what he regarded as his patrimony. Alan is listed among a group of Shropshire magnates, including Corbets and a Peverel, meeting perhaps during Henry I's 1114 military expedition into Wales. Johnson and Cronne tentatively place the meeting at Holdgate Castle in Shropshire. Eyton dates the event earlier, around the time of a royal expedition to Shropshire in 1109. Whatever the date, it shows Alan as an important member of the Shropshire landowning class.

=== Territorial magnate ===
Alan's rapid ascent to wealth and power was a symptom of troubled times. The abortive revolt of Robert de Belleme in 1102 had torn apart the Anglo-Norman system of governing the Welsh Marches. With other Breton friends, Alan had been given forfeited lands in Norfolk and Shropshire, including some which had previously belonged to Robert de Belleme himself. Robert had proved a threat to Henry in both the Welsh Marches and in Normandy, so the king was determined to insert reliable supporters to counterbalance or replace his network of supporters. Alan received more land as he proved his worth. A large portfolio of lands in Shropshire and around Peppering, near Arundel in Sussex, was taken from the holdings of Rainald de Bailleul, ancestor of the House of Balliol, which was also later to provide a king of Scotland. These were lands granted to Rainald by William the Conqueror in recognition of his role as Sheriff of Shropshire. There is no evidence that Rainald or his successor, Hugh, were rebels, and it seems that their lands came to Alan because of his elevation to the shrievalty of the county. He also gained a stake in the very large estates of Ernulf de Hesdin by marriage to his daughter, Avelina.

== Religious grants and foundations ==
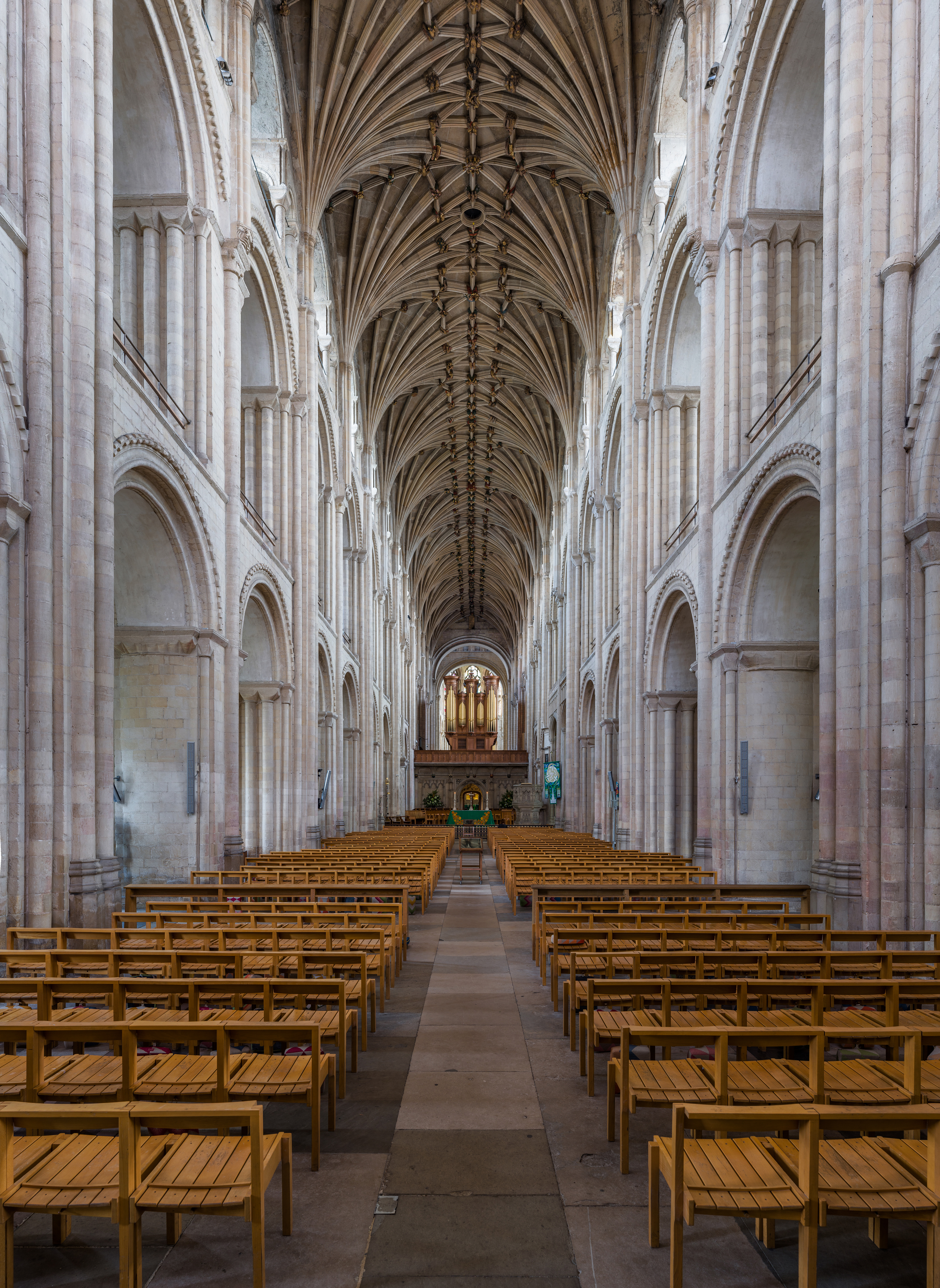
The very long nave of Norwich Cathedral, a Norman foundation under construction in Alan's day. He both witnessed grants to the cathedral and made considerable donations of his own.

Alan was actively involved in a number of grants to religious institutions. One of the grants to Norwich Cathedral that he witnessed in 1101 concerned advowson of the church at Langham, Norfolk, which "had been Alan's", along with the tithes. It is possible this was a donation by himself. At some point unknown he gave the manor of Eaton near Norwich, to Norwich Cathedral, a gift the king promised "to confirm when Alan comes to my court." It is unclear whether this implied the king doubted the existence or the authenticity of the monks' charter: it certainly implies that Alan's attendance at court was to be expected. He also made considerable grants of land to Castle Acre Priory, which lay on the boundary of his Norfolk honour of Mileham.

However, his most important grants in Norfolk were to Sporle Priory, another Benedictine house subject to St Florent de Saumur, which he founded. He gave to the monks of St Florent the church at Sporle, its tithes, a man's landholding, a ploughland in Sporle and another in Mileham, firewood and building timber, and pasture for sheep. The Liber Albus of St Florent mentions that one of the monks present when Alan made the gift was Wihenoc, who initiated the action at Andover. Sporle was later endowed with property in Norfolk villages, including Great and Little Palgrave, where the priory had the church, Great Dunham, Hunstanton and Holme-next-the-Sea.

Alan acquired Upton Magna, the manor in Shropshire on which Haughmond Abbey was later built, as part of the group of estates that had belonged to earlier sheriffs. A note at the beginning of the abbey's cartulary dates the foundation to 1100 but attributes it to Alan's son, William Fitz Alan, which is impossible, as he was not yet born. The existence of a religious community at Haughmond is not definitely attested before a grant of a fishery to what was still a priory by William, around 1135. While Eyton assumed that William was the founder, although at a later date than suggested by the introductory note on the cartulary, the Victoria County History account leaves open the possibility that a small semi-eremitic community existed earlier at Haughmond under Alan's protection, without leaving a written trace.

Alan probably gave many small grants of land or property rights. He gave land at his manor of Stretton-on-Dunsmore in Warwickshire to Burton Abbey. He granted the tithes from his demesne at Burton on Trent to the monks of Léhon in Brittany, where there was a priory subject to the Abbey of Marmoutier: this is known from its confirmation some decades later by his grandson, Alan fitz Jordan. Alan fitz Jordan also confirmed his grandfather's grant to Marmoutier of property at Cuguen, in Brittany, and confirmed or restored Alan fitz Flaad's gift of a mill at Burton to Sele Priory, a small Sussex monastery subordinate to St Florent de Saumur.

== Marriage and family ==
Alan fitz Flaad married Avelina, daughter of Ernulf de Hesdin, a tenant-in-chief in ten counties at the time of Domesday, who was killed on crusade at Antioch. The Burkes' Royal Families of 1848 was one of the sources that asserted Alan's wife was the "daughter and heir of Warine, Sheriff of Shropshire, temp. William the Conqueror." The underlying reasoning seems to be that Alan held the lands formerly held by the sheriffs of the county and goes back at least as far as William Dugdale, but it was rejected by Eyton, not least because of lack of any evidence. He noted that

- William fitz Alan, in grants of his Sussex estates to Haughmond Abbey, referred to his mother as Adelina
- in the account by Orderic Vitalis of the siege of Shrewsbury in 1138, the defender "Ernulf de Heading" is referred to as the avunculus or maternal uncle of William fitz Alan.

By deduction, this Ernulf, who shared his father's name and byname, was the brother of Avelina. Round traced the elder Ernulf's activities in Picardy and confirmed that he had a daughter, called Ava in this context, who was named as one of those consenting to a charter granting family holdings at Hesdin to the Priory of St George, a Benedictine house subject to Anchin Abbey and located by Vieil-Hesdin, the original site of the town of Hesdin. The priory's record of the grant makes clear that Ernulf was riding in the entourage of William Rufus and returning to England at the time.

Issue of Alan and Avelina:

- William fitz Alan, eldest son (d. 1160), made High Sheriff of Shropshire by King Stephen of England in 1137. He married a niece of Robert, 1st Earl of Gloucester. His son, William (d. c. 1210), acquired by marriage the lordship of Clun and he became designated "Lord of Clun and Oswestry". William is ancestor of the FitzAlan Earls of Arundel.
- Walter fitz Alan, second son, became first hereditary High Steward of Scotland, and ancestor of the Stewart Kings of Scotland.
- Jordan fitz Alan, of Burton, who inherited lands in Brittany, and restored to the Priory of St. Florent at Sele, West Sussex, the mill at Burton given it by his father.
- Simon fitz Alan, brother of Walter, who also went to Scotland and witnessed his brother's Foundation Charter of Paisley Abbey. Round suggests he may have been either a uterine brother or even a bastard brother.

After Alan's death, Avelina married Robert fitz Walter, Sheriff of Norfolk and Suffolk, as shown in a grant, dated no earlier than 1126, of their church at Chipping Norton to Gloucester Abbey.

== Death: a contested date ==
Alan's death, when dated at all, is generally said to have been in or by 1114. This is based on the reasoning set out by Eyton. He read in Dugdale's History of Warwickshire that Sybil of Wolston had confirmed a gift of land made by her mother, Adeliza, to Burton Abbey. He was convinced that the land in question belonged to Alan and that Adeliza was the same as Avelina, his wife. As Adeliza would not have been able to grant the land until it passed into her control on his death, and the Abbey was known to have had the land by 1114, it followed that Alan could not have lived beyond 1114. However, Round's research established the reasoning was based on a false premise. Eyton had conflated three distinct but neighbouring Warwickshire manors, all belonging at one time to Rainald de Bailleul. One of the charters he collected, in which Sybil confirms a land grant to the Benedictine abbey at Saint-Pierre-sur-Dives, showed clearly that Sybil was not the daughter of Avelina and Alan but of one Hubert Baldram, a vassal of Rainald. Round thus concluded:

Thus, Adeliza, mother of Sybil, and wife of Hubert Baldran, was quite distinct from Avelina, wife of Alan Fitz Flaald, with whom Mr. Eyton rashly identified her. Alan may have lived, and probably did, beyond 1114...

However, the date stuck and appears in the 1973 Victoria County History account of Haughmond Abbey, it appears as a terminus ante quem for events in Alan's life. It is known that Avelina de Hesdin, as a widow, made a claim for her dower, relating to Eaton manor, against Everard of Calne, Bishop of Norwich. She obtained 100 shillings' worth of land in the manor for life, an award that Henry I confirmed in April/May 1121 at his court in Winchester. Alan's death must have pre-dated this award, but not necessarily by more than a few months.

== Family origins: a contested history ==
=== The controversy over Stewart ancestry ===
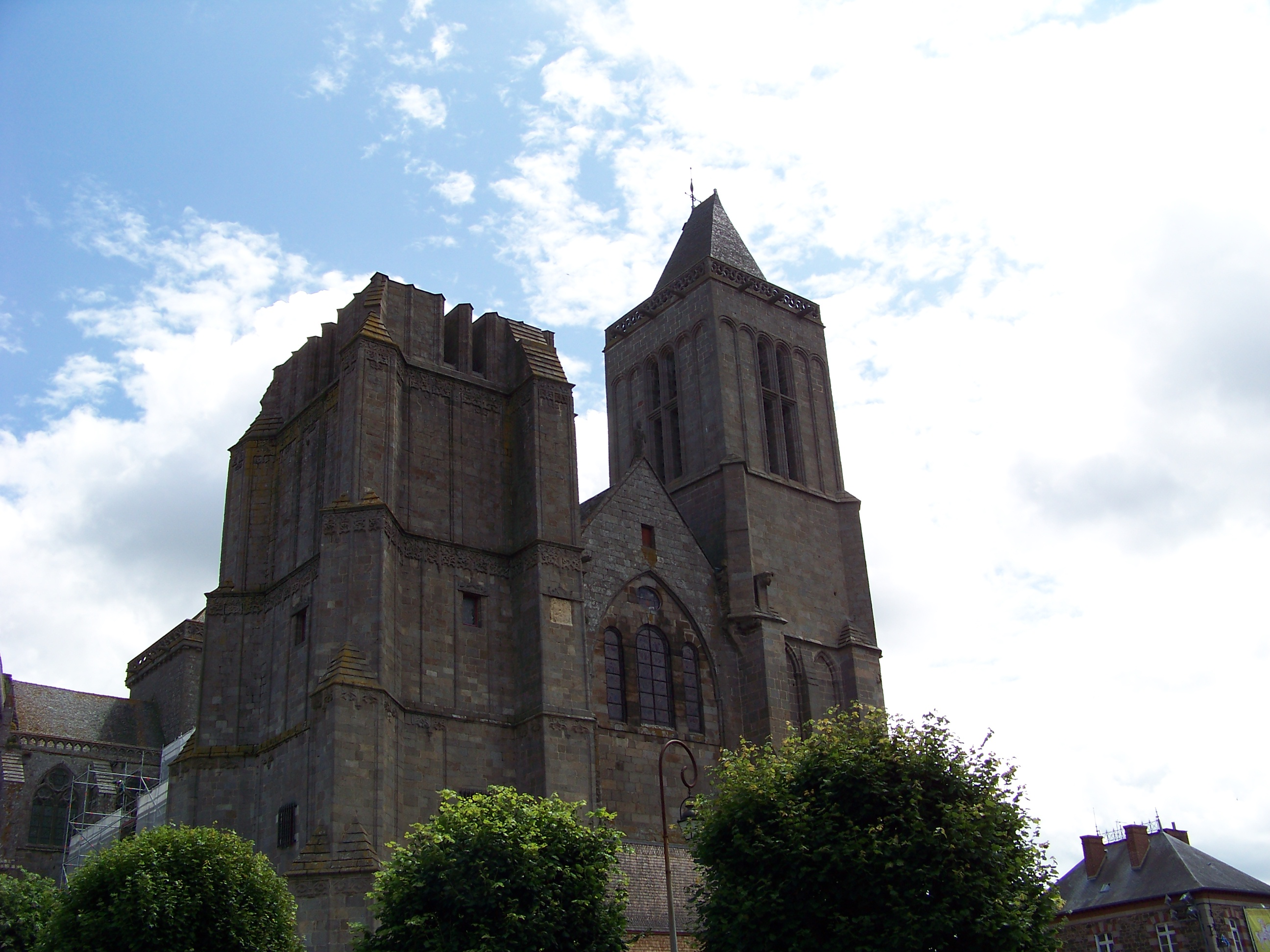
Dol Cathedral (Saint-Samson cathedral) in Dol, Brittany today. The present building was begun about a century after the time of Alan Fitz Flaad.

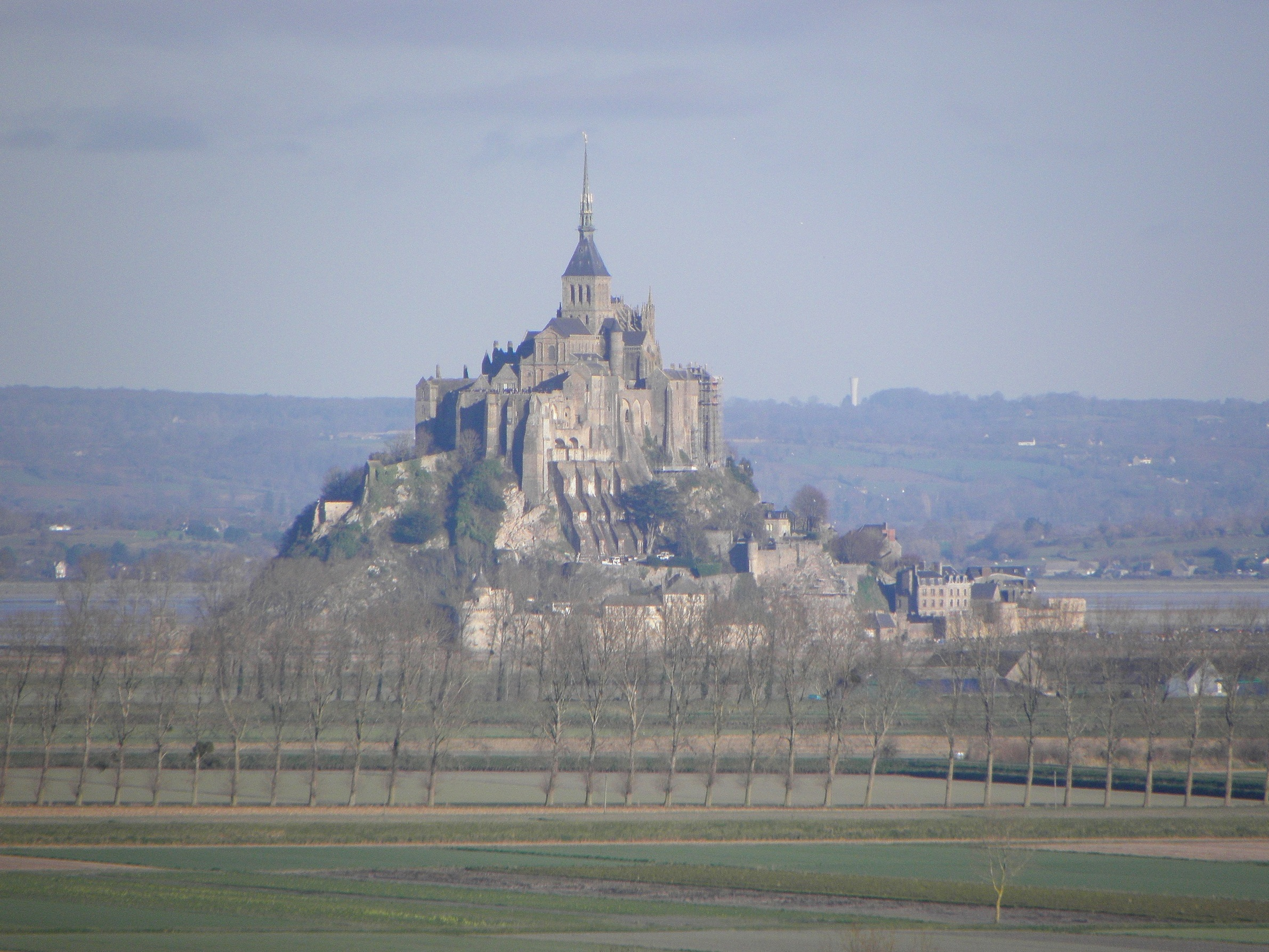
Mont St Michel, the isolated Breton monastery, on the Norman border, which Henry held against his brothers, William Rufus and Robert Curthose, in 1091

Alan's role was formerly obscure because of the political implications of examining the origins of the Stewart dynasty. Holinshed, deriving his information from the work of Hector Boece, asserted that Banquo, Thane of Lochaber, was the ancestor of the Stewarts. Distorting the role of Banquo, who is presented by Holinshed as Macbeth's chief accomplice in regicide, William Shakespeare presented him flatteringly in Macbeth as a martyred ancestor of James VI of Scotland and I of England. These legends, accepted as history, became part of the foundation narrative of the Stewarts and forced later writers to trace the Stewart ancestry through Fleance, Banquo's son. David Symson, the Historiographer Royal of Scotland, in a work dedicated to Queen Anne, followed the chroniclers in having Fleance marry a daughter of the Welsh ruler Gruffydd ap Llywelyn, and then introduced Walter as his son and Alan fitz Walter, 2nd High Steward of Scotland as his grandson. However, this greatly distorted the chronology, forcing Symson to transpose Alan Fitz Walter, actually born around 1140, to about 1073. This created a gap in the record, which was filled by multiplying the Alans and Walters in the Stewart line.

David Dalrymple, Lord Hailes, in his Annals of Scotland, published in the 1770s, went some way to establish a convincing chronology for Walter Fitz Alan, who, he asserted, belonged to the reign of David I of Scotland (1124–53) and his successor, Malcolm IV. Moreover, he was the first of the Stewarts: there were none in the reign of Malcolm III (1058–93), as Symson had been forced to maintain. He went on to demolish the legendary background to the Stewarts, which he described as "flattering and ignorant fictions". He showed that there was a need to distinguish the various Alans who were connected with the Stewart line, something he was unembarrassed to be unable to do:

Some of my readers may demand, "Who then was Alan the father of Walter, Stewart of Scotland in the reign of Malcolm IV?" ... In the reign of David I, before the middle of the twelfth century, the family of the Stewarts was opulent and powerful. It may, therefore, have subsisted for many ages previous to that time; but when, and what was its commencement, we cannot determine.

Andrew Stuart, a notable Scottish MP, accepted Dalrymple's critical work on the legendary ancestors, although he included among these a crusader Alan who was subsequently to emerge as genuine. He sought to establish a definite chronological framework, placing Walter Fitz Alan's death in 1177.

Not until the first decade of the 19th century did George Chalmers prove that Walter Fitz Alan, an acknowledged link in the Stewart ancestry, came from Shropshire and was the son of Alan Fitz Flaad. This finally established Alan Fitz Flaad's existence and importance and confirmed the kinship between the Stewarts and the FitzAlan Earls of Arundel. Even then, the legendary background took almost a century to fade. In 1858, Robert William Eyton, the distinguished historian of Shropshire, while clarifying Alan Fitz Flaad's connection with the county and details of his marriage, still tried to maintain a link with the legendary Banquo, and even surmised that Flaad was actually Fleance.

After an anonymous work of 1874 drew attention to a strong connection between Alan Fitz Flaad and Brittany, and confirmed Flaad's relationship to Alan the Seneschal, J. Horace Round definitively established and publicized Alan Fitz Flaad's true Breton origins in 1901 in a collection of genealogical essays. Alan's father, Flaad (rendered in numerous ways, including Flaald and Flathald), was a son (or possibly a brother) of Alain, dapifer to the Ancient Diocese of Dol, with its see at Dol-de-Bretagne, who had taken part in the First Crusade in 1097. "Alan Dapifer" is found as a witness in 1086 to a charter relating to Mezuoit, a cell near Dol of the Abbey of Saint-Florent de Saumur. The area of Dol is near Mont-Saint-Michel and has figured in the history of the Duchy of Brittany since at least the rule of Nominoe. Round's genealogy was confirmed in 1904 by Sir James Balfour Paul, then Lord Lyon King of Arms, who, in a definitive work, The Scots Peerage, stated that "the Stewarts or Stuarts are of Breton origin, descended from a family which held the office of Seneschal or Steward of Dol." He then reinstated Alan Fitz Flaad to his place in the ancestry of the Scottish royal family and gave a summary of what was known of his career.

=== Alan fitz Flaad: family tree ===
Round provided a family tree to embody his essential findings, which is adapted below.

Family of Alan fitz Flaad

Alan, Dapifer Dolensis (Seneschal or Steward of Dol)
Alan, Dapifer Dolensis, Took part in First Crusade, 1097.	Flaad; Occurs at Monmouth, 1101/2	Rhiwallon; Monk of St Florent
Alan Fitz Flaad, Founder of Sporle Priory
Jordan Fitz Alan, Dapifer in Brittany, Benefactor of Sele Priory	William Fitz Alan, Lord of Oswestry; Founder/benefactor of Haughmond Abbey, Died 1160	Walter Fitz Alan; Dapifer Regis Scotiae, Founder of Paisley Abbey, Died 1177
Alan Fitz Jordan, Dapifer Dolensis	William Fitz Alan II, Lord of Oswestry and Clun	Alan the Steward; Senescallus Regis Scotiae
