= John Fitzalan (1223–1267) =

English baron

- Born: 1223
- Died: 1267 (aged 43–44)
- Buried: Haughmond Abbey, Shropshire
- Noble family: FitzAlan
- Spouse: Maud Botiller
- Issue: 3, including John FitzAlan III
- Father: John FitzAlan I
- Mother: Isabel d'Aubigny

John II Fitzalan (1223–1267), Lord of Oswestry, Clun, and Arundel, was an English nobleman and Marcher Lord with lands in the Welsh Marches.

== Family ==
The son and heir of John Fitzalan, Lord of Oswestry and Clun, from Shropshire. His mother was Isabel, the daughter of William d'Aubigny, 3rd Earl of Arundel by his wife, Mabel of Chester. John obtained possession of his paternal estates on 26 May 1244, aged 21 years.

After the death of his mother's childless brother Hugh d'Aubigny, 5th Earl of Arundel, he inherited jure matris the castle and honour of Arundel in 1243, by which, according to Henry VI's "admission" of 1433, he was later retrospectively held to have become de jure Earl of Arundel. He was never styled as such during his lifetime, however.

== Welsh conflicts ==
In 1257, Welsh Lord Gruffydd ap Gwenwynwyn, in the southern realm of the Kingdom of Powys, sought the aid of the Lord of Oswestry against Llywelyn ap Gruffudd. John Fitzalan was a surviving member of the English force that was defeated at the hands of the Welsh at Cymerau (near Nantgaredig) in Carmarthenshire.

In 1258, he was one of the key English military commanders in the Welsh Marches and was summoned yet again in 1260 for further conflict against the Welsh. John vacillated in the conflicts between Henry III and the Barons. He fought on the King's side at the Battle of Lewes in 1264, where he was taken prisoner. From 1278 to 1282, his sons were engaged in Welsh border hostilities, attacking the lands of Llywelyn.

He is buried at Haughmond Abbey in Shropshire.

== Marriage ==
He married Maud de Verdon, daughter of Theobald le Botiller (Boteler) by his wife Rohesia de Verdon alias Rohese (daughter of Nicholas de Verdun and Clemence); by whom he had children including:

- John Fitzalan III, eldest son and heir.
- Joan FitzAlan (c. 1267 – after 6 October 1316), wife of Sir Richard of Cornwall (died 1296), an illegitimate son of Richard of England, 1st Earl of Cornwall and King of the Romans (1209–1272) (the second son of King John (1199–1216)).
- Maud FitzAlan who married Sir Robert Corbet of Moreton Corbet Castle. They were the parents of Canon Fulk Corbet of Lichfield Cathedral in Staffordshire.

== Sources ==
- Weis, Frederick Lewis, Ancestral Roots of Certain American Colonists Who Came to America Before 1700 (lines: 70A-29, 149-29, Genealogical Pub Co; 7th edition (January 1, 1992); ISBN 978-0806313672

Preceded by Hugh d'Aubigny	Lord of Arundel; 1264–1267	Succeeded by John Fitzalan III
Preceded by John Fitzalan I	Lord of Oswestry and Clun; 1240–1267	Succeeded by John Fitzalan III
