= William FitzAlan, 2nd Lord of Oswestry and Clun =

William FitzAlan was a Norman nobleman who lived in Oswestry and Clun near Shrewsbury, along the medieval Welsh Marches. William was the son of William FitzAlan, controlling the castles of Clun and Oswestry and later became the High Sheriff of Shropshire. Many people today will often confuse William with his father, as their death dates are similar by 5 years. Because of this, it is important to know that this William was married to Mary Erington, the daughter of Thomas. William's father William (d. 1210) married the daughter of Hugh de Lacy, whose name is never mentioned in any documents. When William came to inherit his lands in 1210, King John demanded a fee of 10,000 marks; unable to pay, William was unable to inherit. He only outlived his father by a few years, dying around Easter 1215. The estates were eventually reclaimed by his younger brother John Fitzalan.

== Bibliography ==
- Burke, John. (1831) A General and Heraldic Dictionary of the Peerages of England, Ireland, and Scotland. London: Colburn and Bentley.
- Eyton, William. (1862) "The Castles of Shropshire and its Border." in Collectanea Archæologica: communications made to the British Archaeological Association Vol. 1. London: Longman.
- Mackenzie, James D. (1896) The Castles of England: Their Story and Structure, Vol II. New York: Macmillan.
- Antiquities of Shropshire, vol. 3, By Robert W. Eyton (1856). p. 11
- Antiquities of Shropshire, vol. 5, By Robert W. Eyton (1857). p. 86 Antiquities of Shropshire, vol. 7, By Robert W. Eyton (1858).
- p. 242 Antiquities of Shropshire, vol. 10, By Robert W. Eyton (1860). p. 126
- Complete Peerage XII (2) p. 168 fn. g
