= William Fitz Alan, 2nd Lord of Oswestry and Clun =

William Fitz Alan was a Norman nobleman who lived in Oswestry and Clun near Shrewsbury, along the medieval Welsh Marches. William was the son of William Fitz Allan, controlling the castles of Clun and Oswestry and later became the High Sheriff of Shropshire. William married a daughter of Hugh de Lacy, of which no first name is mentioned in any record known. When William came to inherit his lands in 1210, King John demanded a fee of 10,000 marks; unable to pay, William was unable to inherit. He only outlived his father by a few years, dying around Easter 1215. The estates were eventually reclaimed by his younger brother John Fitzalan.

== Bibliography ==
- Burke, John. (1831) A General and Heraldic Dictionary of the Peerages of England, Ireland, and Scotland. London: Colburn and Bentley.
- Eyton, William. (1862) "The Castles of Shropshire and its Border." in Collectanea Archæologica: communications made to the British Archaeological Association Vol. 1. London: Longman.
- Mackenzie, James D. (1896) The Castles of England: Their Story and Structure, Vol II. New York: Macmillan.
- Antiquities of Shropshire, vol. 3, By Robert W. Eyton (1856). p. 11
- Antiquities of Shropshire, vol. 5, By Robert W. Eyton (1857). p. 86
- Antiquities of Shropshire, vol. 7, By Robert W. Eyton (1858). p. 242
- Antiquities of Shropshire, vol. 10, By Robert W. Eyton (1860). p. 126
- Complete Peerage XII (2) p. 168 fn. g
