= Sporle Priory =

Monastery in Norfolk, England

Sporle Priory was a Benedictine priory in Norfolk, England. It was founded by Alan fitz Flaad in the early 12th century, Benedictine and given to the monks of the Abbey of Saint-Florent, Saumur free-of-charge as an alien priory. It was vacant for some time after the Black Death, and was dissolved in 1424.

Fitz Flaad gave to the monks of Saint-Florent the church at Sporle, its tithes, a man's landholding, a ploughland in Sporle and another in Mileham, firewood and building timber, and pasture for sheep. Sporle was later endowed with property in Norfolk villages, including Great and Little Palgrave, where the priory had the church, Great Dunham, Hunstanton and Holme-next-the-Sea.
