= Simon, brother of Walter fitz Alan =

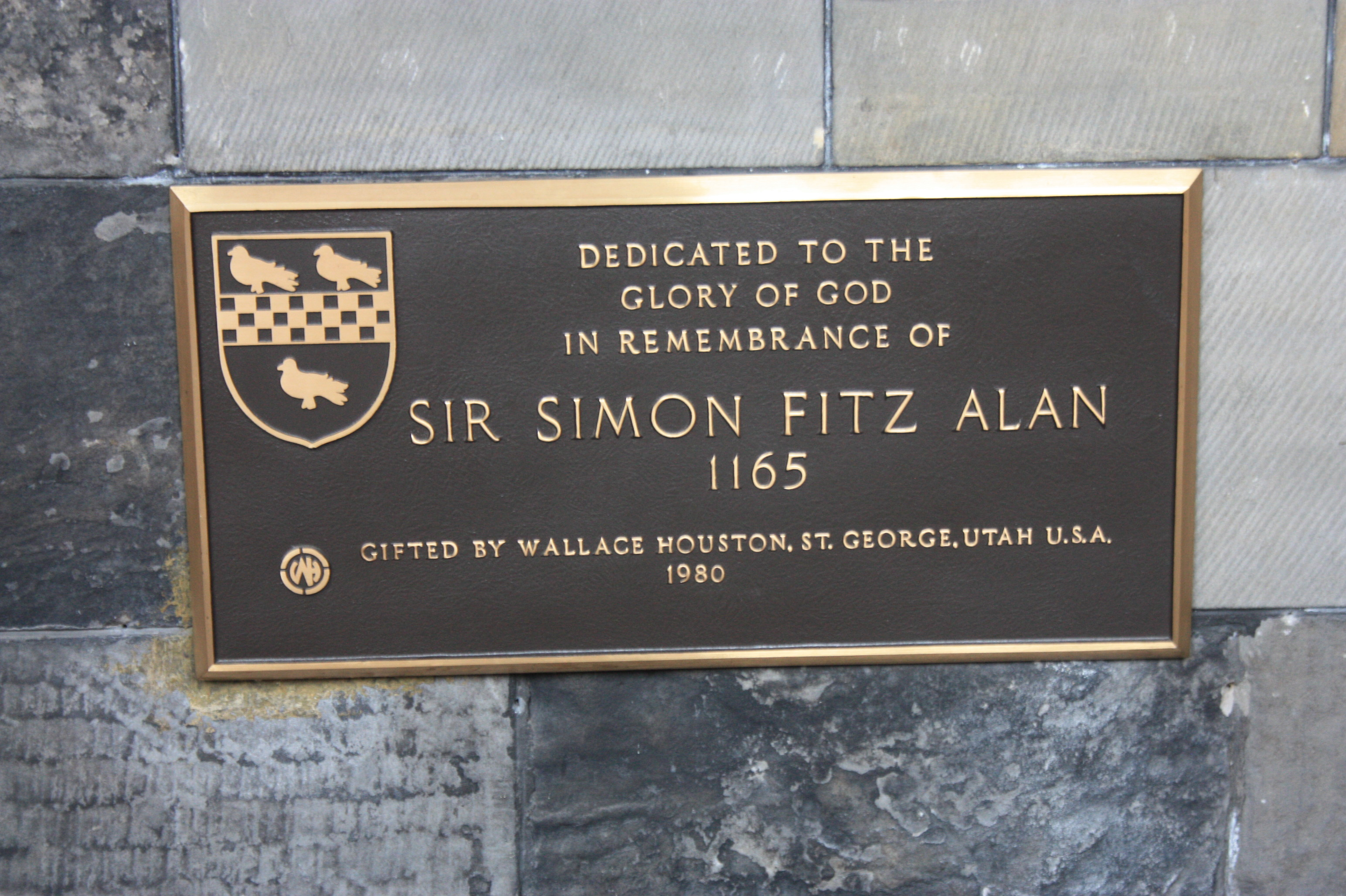
Memorial to Simon at Paisley Abbey

Simon (fl. 1162×1163) was a twelfth-century Anglo-Norman.

== Uncertain parentage ==
Simon may have been a son of Avelina de Hesdin and her second husband, Robert fitz Walter. As such, Simon seems to have been a uterine brother of Avelina's sons by her earlier marriage to Alan fitz Flaald: Jordan fitz Alan (fl. 1128–1130), William fitz Alan (died 1160), and Walter fitz Alan (died 1177).

Simon is recorded to have witnessed a grant of Walter to Paisley Priory. The fact that he appears at the bottom of the listed witnesses, and is described as a brother of Walter, could indicate that the men were uterine brothers.

Simon is also recorded to have issued a confirmation of a grant by Alan and his mother concerning the latter's lands of Kempston, Sporle, and Newton.

Simon is sometimes alleged to have been a son of Avelina and Alan, and to have been an ancestor of the Boyd family.
