= Oswestry Castle =

Motte-and-bailey mediaeval castle in Oswestry, Shropshire, England, UK

Coordinates: 52.86111°N 3.05524°W

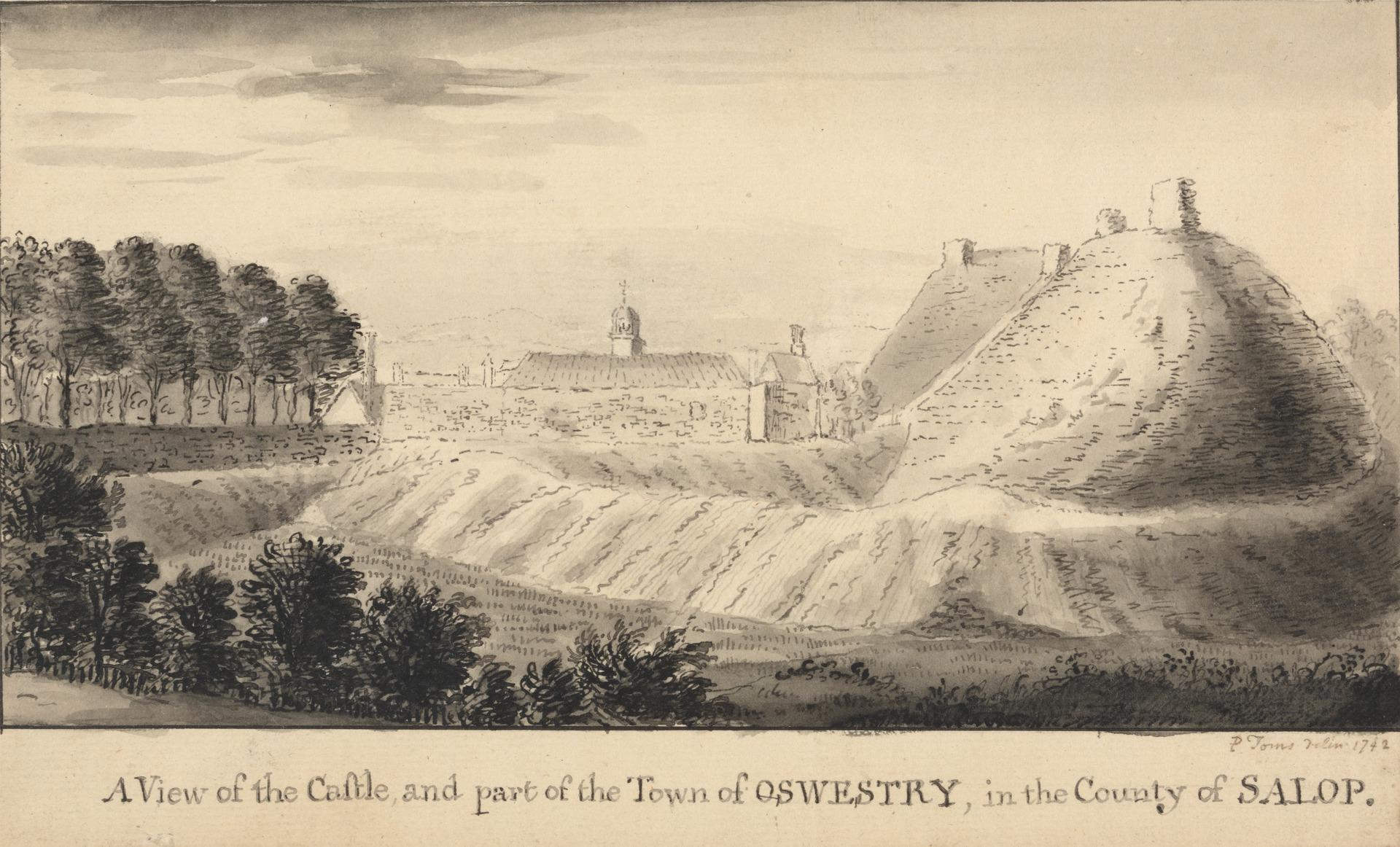
Peter Toms - A View of the Castle and Part of the Town of Oswestry

Oswestry Castle is a medieval castle in the town of Oswestry, Shropshire, England. The castle has also been known as, or recorded in historical documents as: Album Monasterium; Blancminster; Blankmouster; Blancmustier; Croes Oswald; L'Oeuvre; L'uvre; Castle Loure; Luure; Luvre; Lvvre: Castle Philip; Oswaldestre; Meresberie.

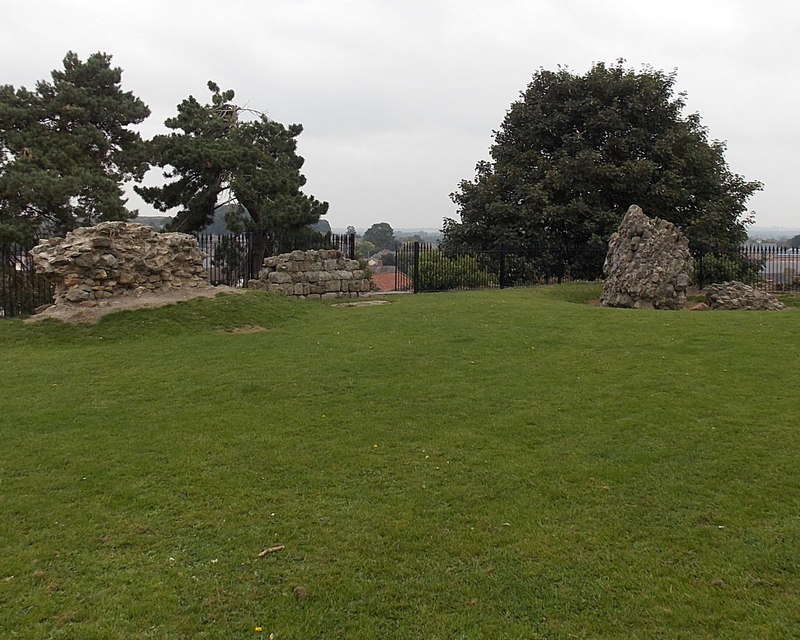
Fragmentary remains of Oswestry Castle

The first reference to the castle in Oswestry was in 1086, when castelle Lurve (or castle L’oeuvre) is recorded in the Domesday Book as being built by Rainald, Sheriff of Shropshire in the Hundred of Meresberie. No town was recorded until around 1272 when references appear to the settlement of Blancminster (named after its white stone church). The Welsh were already referring to Croes Oswallt (Cross of Oswald) in 1254, regarding St Oswald, the Northumbrian king killed at the Battle of Maserfield (reputed to have taken place near Oswestry) in 641 AD.

After Rainald the castle passed to Alan fitz Flaad. The civil war between Stephen and Empress Matilda (1135–54) saw the Marcher Lord of Oswestry, William FitzAlan, join forces with Matilda. As a consequence he was deprived of his lands, including the castle and its area, and titles by Stephen after 1138, when he fled into exile. The castle was reclaimed by Madog ap Maredudd the Prince of Powys between 1149 and 1154, along with the lordship of the area. This was short-lived; on the accession of Henry II in 1154, William FitzAlan recovered his estates and was restored as High Sheriff of Shropshire in 1155 until his death in 1160. A period of conflict between the Welsh and the English followed and the castle was sacked numerous times. In 1165, Henry himself adopted it as a base for his unsuccessful campaign against Owain Gwynedd. In 1211 King John moved against Llywelyn the Great and the castle came under attack. By 1270 the castle’s walls had been extended to embrace the town, but its military significance declined.

The castle was garrisoned by Royalist troops during the Civil War, and captured by the forces of Oliver Cromwell in 1644. It had been largely demolished by the Roundheads by 1650.

The motte is about 12m high and 52m by 72m at its base. The collapsed remnants of the stone keep, possibly dating to the 13th century, are in situ. The remains of the keep are a Grade II Listed Building. The internal layout of the keep is not known, but an inventory compiled in 1398 notes three chambers, hall, chapel dedicated to St Nicholas, kitchen, larder and buttery. To the south east of the keep are the remains of a bastion, largely rebuilt in the late 19th century, it is a Grade II Listed Building. The walls and the gate piers are also Grade II Listed. The castle bailey, which lies to the south of the motte, probably served as the initial focus for the development of the town. The town had grown beyond the limits of the bailey before the second half of the 13th century when the town walls were constructed. The location of the bailey is recorded in the street names Bailey Street and Bailey Head.

== See also ==
- Listed buildings in Oswestry
