= John Fitzalan (died 1240) =

13th-century Norman nobleman

- Tenure: 1215–1240
- Predecessor: William Fitz Alan, 2nd Lord of Oswestry and Clun
- Successor: John Fitzalan, 4th Lord of Oswestry and Clun
- Born: 1200
- Died: 1240 (aged 39–40)
- Spouse: Isabel d'Aubigny (before 1223)
- Issue: John Fitzalan II
- Father: William FitzAlan, 1st Lord of Oswestry and Clun

John Fitzalan, 3rd Lord of Clun and Oswestry (1200–1240) was a Norman nobleman in the Welsh Marches in the county of Shropshire.

== Family ==
John succeeded his brother, William Fitz Alan, 2nd Lord of Oswestry and Clun, who died in 1215 without issue. They were sons of William Fitz Alan, 1st Lord of Oswestry and Clun (died c. 1210) and a daughter of Hugh de Lacy, name unknown; The FitzAlans were descendants of Alan fitzFlaad, a Breton.

== Royal conflicts ==
He was one of the feudal barons who became a target for the anger of King John of England, whose forces attacked Oswestry town and burned it in 1216. John FitzAlan was close to Llywelyn ap Iorwerth until 1217.

He was also a representative of the Crown in a dispute between King Henry III of England and the Welsh leader, Llywelyn the Great in 1226. In the same year he mediated between a neighbour, William Pantulf (died 1233), Lord of Wem in Shropshire and Madog ap Gruffydd (died 1236), Lord of Powys and a cousin to Llywelyn ap Iorwerth.

In 1233/4 during the conflict between King Henry III, the Earl Marshal, and Llywelyn the Great, John FitzAlan sided firmly with the Crown and Oswestry was again attacked, this time by Welsh forces.

== Marriage and issue ==
He married Isabel d'Aubigny, daughter of William d'Aubigny, 3rd Earl of Arundel and Mabel of Chester, and they were parents of:

- John Fitzalan, Lord of Clun & Oswestry, and Arundel, whose grandson became Earl of Arundel.
