= Sporle with Palgrave =

Civil parish in Norfolk, England

Coordinates: 52.66795°N 0.73231°E

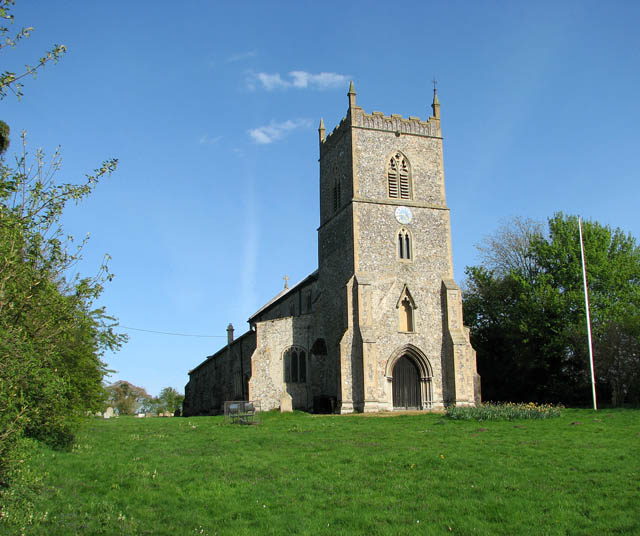
- St Mary's Church, Sporle

- Location within Norfolk
- Area: 17.21 km^{2} (6.64 sq mi)
- Population: 1,011 (2011 census)
  - Density: 59/km^{2} (150/sq mi)
- OS grid reference: TF848113
- Civil parish: Sporle with Palgrave
- District: Breckland
- Shire county: Norfolk
- Region: East
- Country: England
- Sovereign state: United Kingdom
- Post town: KING'S LYNN
- Postcode district: PE32
- Police: Norfolk
- Fire: Norfolk
- Ambulance: East of England

Sporle with Palgrave is a civil parish in the English county of Norfolk. It covers an area of 17.21 km^{2} (6.64 sq mi) and had a population of 1,038 in 442 households at the 2001 census, including East Lexham but the population reducing to 1,011 in 453 households at the 2011 Census. For the purposes of local government, it falls within the district of Breckland.

== The village ==
The village has a church, St Mary's, and is also served by a village shop and a pub called The King Charles III. There are active book clubs and a bus service. There is a primary school and a separate community centre.

St Mary's Church is a Grade I listed building. Edmund Nelson was curate and subsequently rector of Sporle; Susannah, the oldest sister of Horatio Nelson, 1st Viscount Nelson, was born here on 12 June 1755.

== See also ==
- Sporle Priory
- Sporle railway station
- Spurrell
