= Saint-Georges, Pas-de-Calais =

Saint-Georges
- Commune
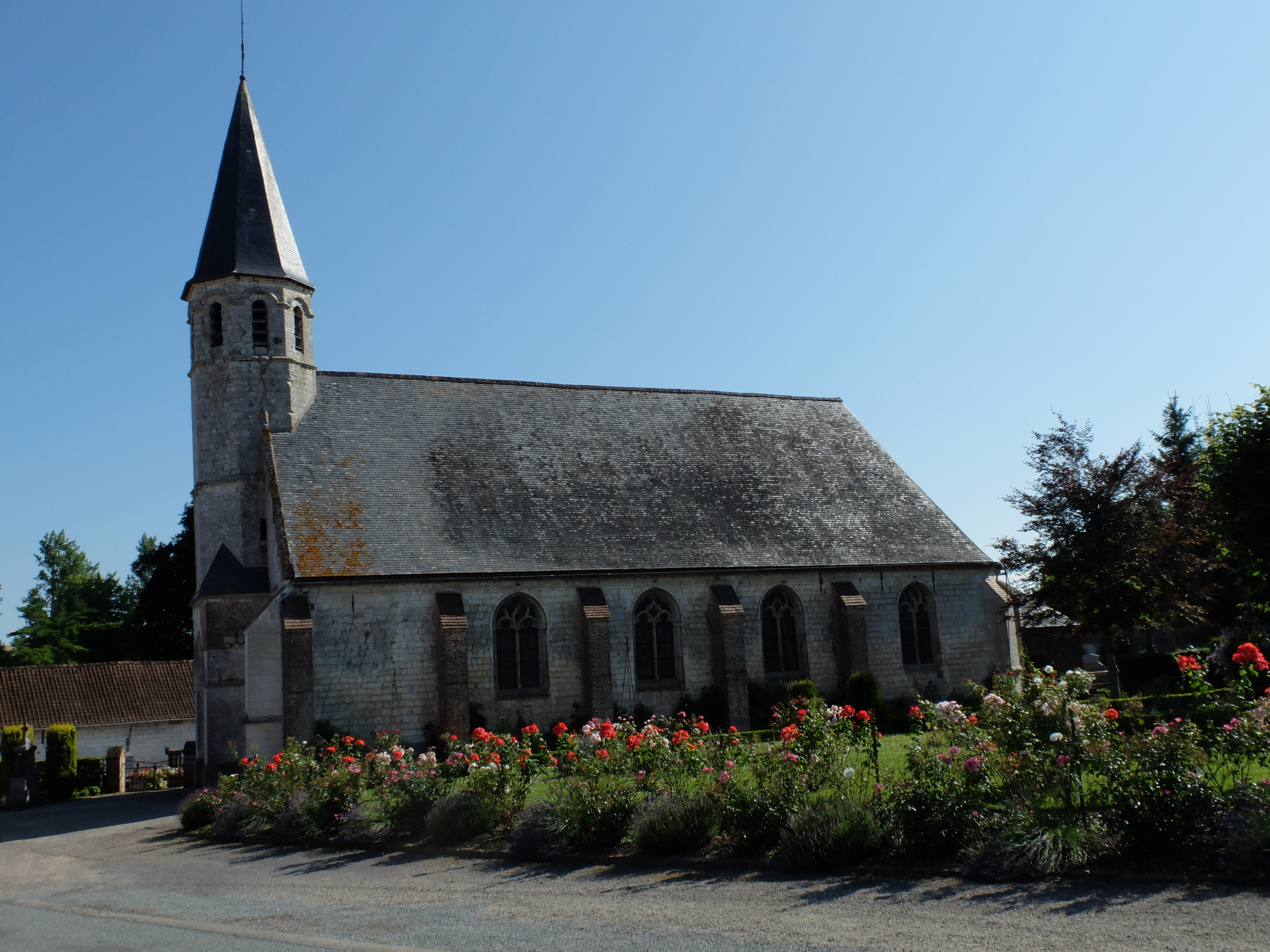
- The church of Saint-Georges

- Coat of arms
- Location of Saint-Georges
- Location within France Location within Hauts-de-France
- Coordinates: 50°21′32″N 2°05′06″E
- Country: France
- Region: Hauts-de-France
- Department: Pas-de-Calais
- Arrondissement: Montreuil
- Canton: Auxi-le-Château
- Intercommunality: CC des 7 Vallées

Government
  - Mayor (2020–2026): Bruno Leveque
- Area^{1}: 9.69 km^{2} (3.74 sq mi)
- Elevation: 36 m (118 ft)
- Highest elevation: 134 m (440 ft)
- Lowest elevation: 27 m (89 ft)
- Population (2023): 318
  - Density: 32.8/km^{2} (85.0/sq mi)
- Time zone: UTC+01:00 (CET)
  - Summer (DST): UTC+02:00 (CEST)
- INSEE/Postal code: 62749 /62770
- ^{1} French Land Register data, which excludes lakes, ponds, glaciers > 1 km^{2} (0.386 sq mi or 247 acres) and river estuaries.

Saint-Georges (French pronunciation: [sɛ̃ ʒɔʁʒ]) is a commune in the Pas-de-Calais department in the Hauts-de-France region of France.

It has a canting coat-of-arms: the Cross of Saint George.

== Geography ==
Saint-Georges is in the valley of the river Canche, 18 miles (27 km) southeast of Montreuil-sur-Mer and 3 miles (5 km) to the east of Hesdin.

== Population ==
Historical population
Year	Pop.	±% p.a.
1968	271	—
1975	293	+1.12%
1982	305	+0.58%
1990	305	+0.00%
1999	266	−1.51%
2007	300	+1.51%
2012	321	+1.36%
2017	326	+0.31%
2023	318	−0.41%
Source: INSEE

== See also ==
Communes of the Pas-de-Calais department
