= Abbey of Saint-Florent, Saumur =

Coordinates: 47°15′55.64″N 0°6′10.6″W

- Abbaye Saint-Florent de Saumur (French)
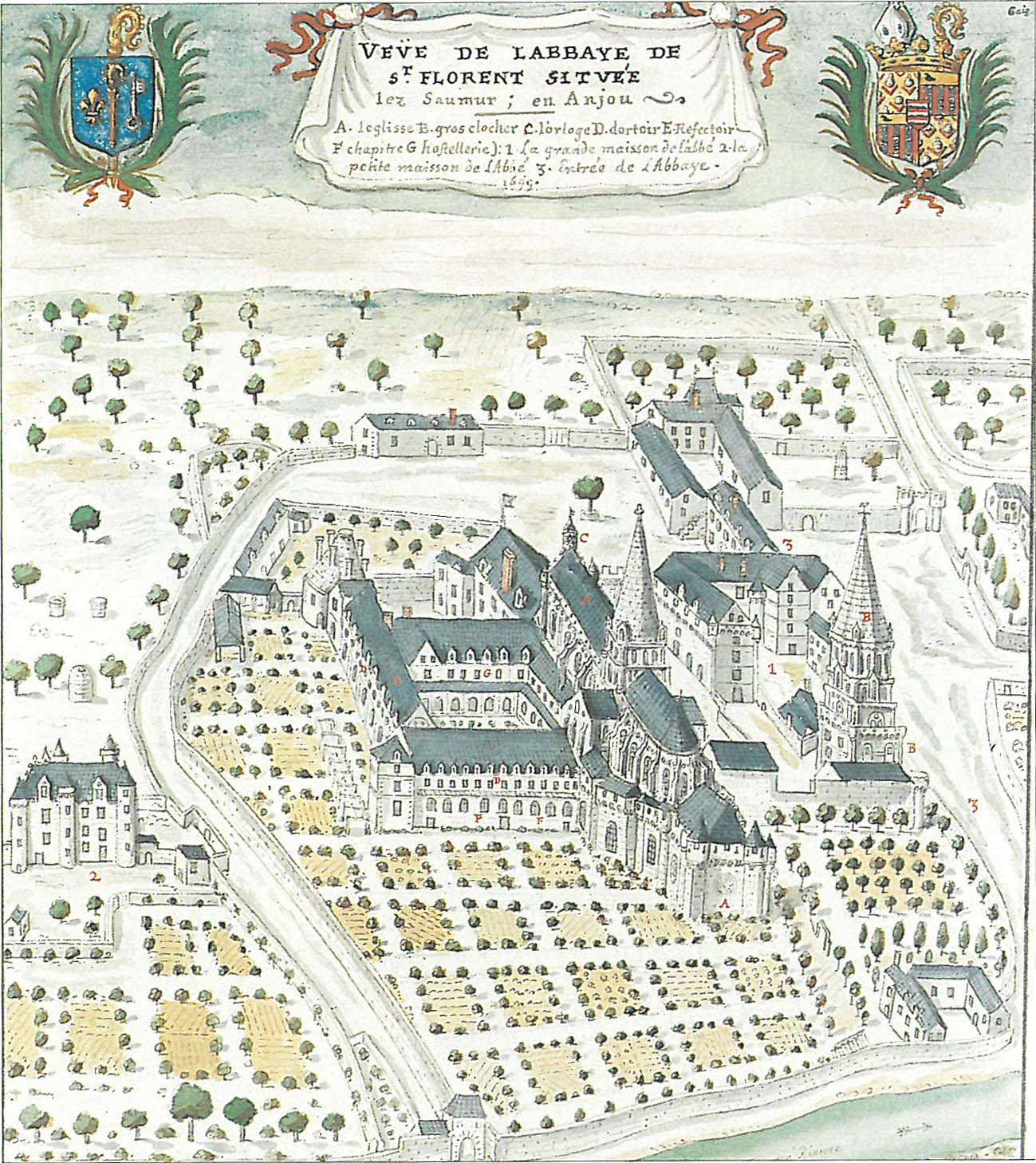
- View of the abbey of Saint-Florent in 1699.

- Location within France
- Location: Saumur, France

History
- Built: 1026

Site notes
- Architectural styles: Roman, Gothic, Classical

Monument historique
- Designated: 1964 and 1973
- Reference no.: PA00109302

The Abbey of Saint-Florent, Saumur, also Saint-Florent-lès-Saumur or Saint-Florent-le-Jeune, was a Benedictine abbey in Anjou founded in the 11th century near Saumur, France. It was the successor of the Abbey of Saint-Florent-le-Vieil which was abandoned by its monks during raids of the Vikings. Both were dedicated to Florent of Anjou, a local saint.

Following its surrender in the French Revolution, most of the monastic buildings were destroyed in the 19th century. The remainder were listed as a historical monument in 1964 and 1973.

== History ==
=== Foundation ===
According to legend, as told by Célestin Port in his historical dictionary, the monk Absalon came to Anjou with the relics of his patron saint, which he had taken from the monks of Tournus. He took refuge in caves on the banks of the Loire, in Montsoreau, in which he was first considering to shelter the relics. This region was overlooked by the primitive castle of Saumur, which then belonged to Theobald I, Count of Blois. Informed of his presence, the count permitted him to settle with his treasure and a small group of monks within the bounds of the castle. He also sent for a colony of twelve benedictine monks from Fleury-sur-Loire. The abbey of Tournus restored the sacred vases and a portion of the books and maps of Mont-Glonne. Hélie, Absalon's first companion, was given control of the new work, and, as of May 2, 950, could help consecrate the basilica. A "splendid" cloister was added to the monastery.

This story, although likely inaccurate, has some plausible elements. The community, after a century of absence, did not return to the early site at Mont-Glonne, but to the castrum of the city of Saumur, which was then on Thibault de Blois's land. The return took place between 956 and 973 with the foundation of a new abbey church. The Mont-Glonne territory, thenceforth Saint-Florent-le-Vieil, was preserved in the new foundation of Saumur, but became an outbuilding. It nevertheless enjoyed a special statute. In 1026, Foulques Nerra, the count of Anjou, took the city and the castle. The monks absolutely refused to move to the site in Angers that was offered to them.

=== Foundation outside of the city ===
The layout of the city forced the monks to build on the left bank of the Thouet, near where this river joins the Loire. This was part of the land of the Verrie villa, which already belonged to the community. After all of these events, beginning in the fourth century, the latter half of the ninth century ushered in a period of expansion for the young abbey. It took the name of Saint-Florent-lès-Saumur, in contrast with Saint-Florent-du-Château (of Saumur). Left to themselves, the monks settled in one of their old estates, obtained in 849, near the church of Saint-Hilaire-des-Grottes. Six of them returned to the rebuilt castle of Saumur and built a small chapel there, which was consecrated by the bishop of Angers.

=== Late medieval issues ===
The Hundred Years' War transformed the abbey into a fortress visited in turn by various troops. The monks kept guard; royal letters dated 24 November 1369 forced all inhabitants of the levee on the right bank to keep watch there at all times. Abbots Jean and Louis du Bellay rebuilt the ruins and reconstructed the church and convent, but a greater problem surfaced soon after. Priories fell into the hands of laypeople or "friars who were no better", as D. Huynes says, even heretics, and the deserted chapels of obedience were transformed into granaries and stables. In the abbey itself, disorder reigned and festered among the proceedings of the abbots and friars.

=== Transfer of relics ===
In 1475, threatened by the approaching landing of the English army, King Louis XI made a long campaign in Picardy and Normandy. In the beginning of May, he had discovered the body of Saint Florent by chance in the church of Saint-Georges de Roye. Having definitively ended the Hundred Years' War in August, with the Treaty of Picquigny, the king retook Tours on 24 November after an absence of sixteen months. His first trip after this return was a pilgrimage to Saint-Florent de Saumur, carried out on 7 December. This departure was unusual, as the king otherwise did not leave Tours until 10 February of the following year. By order of the king, transfer of the relics was completed in 1480 by the collegiate of Roye à Saumur. After his death, the royal canons had the power to partially reclaim them according to their own wishes.

== See also ==
- High medieval domes
