= William FitzAlan, 1st Lord of Oswestry and Clun =

English noble

William FitzAlan (died 1210) was a Norman nobleman who lived in Oswestry and Clun, near Shrewsbury, along the medieval Welsh Marches. William was the son of William FitzAlan and Christina.

He was the first FitzAlan to hold both the castles of Clun and Oswestry in his own right, and was responsible for the significant expansion of Clun Castle. William was still in his minority in 1160, and Guy Lestrange was appointed as his guardian. William later had two sons, the first also called William FitzAlan and a younger son, John by the daughter of Hugh de Lacy, Lord of Meath and Rohese of Monmouth, whose name is not mentioned in any documents.

Upon William's death in 1210, the eldest son succeeded his father.

== Bibliography ==
- Brown, Reginald Allen. (1989) Castles From The Air. Cambridge: Cambridge University Press. ISBN 978-0-521-32932-3.
- Mackenzie, James D. (1896) The Castles of England: Their Story and Structure, Vol II. New York: Macmillan.
- Antiquities of Shropshire, vol. 3, By Robert W. Eyton (1856). p. 11
- Antiquities of Shropshire, vol. 5, By Robert W. Eyton (1857). p. 86
- Antiquities of Shropshire, vol. 7, By Robert W. Eyton (1858). p. 242
- Antiquities of Shropshire, vol. 10, By Robert W. Eyton (1860). p. 126
- Complete Peerage XII (2) p. 168 fn. g
