= William FitzAlan, Lord of Oswestry =

English Marcher lord

William FitzAlan
- Lord of Oswestry; High Sheriff of Shropshire
- Born: c. 1085; England
- Died: 3 April 1160; England
- Buried: Shrewsbury Abbey
- Noble family: Arundel
- Spouses: Christiana (until her death, before 1155); Isabel de Say
- Issue: William Fitz Alan, 1st Lord of Oswestry and Clun; Christiana m. Hugh Pantulf, 4th Baron of Wem
- Father: Alan fitz Flaad
- Mother: Avelina de Hesdin
- Occupation: English Marcher Lord

William FitzAlan (1085–1160) was a nobleman of Breton ancestry. He was a major landowner, a Marcher lord with large holdings in Shropshire, where he was the Lord of Oswestry, as well as in Norfolk and Sussex. He took the side of Empress Matilda during the Anarchy and underwent considerable hardship in the Angevin cause before regaining his lands and former status. William's younger brother, Walter fitz Alan (d. 1177), became ancestor of the royal House of Stuart.

== Background and early life ==
William was born around 1085. He was the eldest son and heir of Alan fitz Flaad, a Breton noble whose family were closely associated with the sacred environs of Dol-de-Bretagne, close to the border with Normandy and a short distance south-west of the great abbey of Mont Saint-Michel. Alan was a close ally of Henry I of England (1100-1135), who was determined to insert reliable supporters into strategically key areas after the disloyalty of Robert of Bellême, 3rd Earl of Shrewsbury, who had a strong support network in the Marches. Alan received extensive fiefs in Shropshire and Norfolk from around the beginning of Henry's reign and more as he proved his worth. Much of the Shropshire land was taken from the holdings of Rainald de Bailleul, ancestor of the House of Balliol, as was land around Peppering, near Arundel in Sussex.

William's mother was Avelina de Hesdin. Her father was Ernulf de Hesdin (also transcribed as Arnulf), a crusader baron from Hesdin in Artois, which was a fief of the County of Flanders and only loosely attached to France. Ernulf built up large holdings in Staffordshire and Gloucestershire. After his death in the First Crusade, Avelina's brother, also called Ernulf, inherited his lands and titles.

== Baron and rebel ==
William succeeded his father around 1114, probably still aged under 10. He was appointed the High Sheriff of Shropshire by Adeliza of Louvain, the second wife of Henry I. His first notable appearance is as a witness to King Stephen's charter to Shrewsbury Abbey in 1136.

As Sheriff of the county, William was also castellan of Shrewsbury Castle. In 1138, he joined in the revolt against Stephen and garrisoned the castle against the king. After resisting the attacks of the royal army for a month, he fled with his family in August 1138, leaving the castle to be defended by his uncle, Ernulf de Hesdin. When the town fell, Stephen acted in anger, hanging Ernulf and 93 others immediately, frightening the local people and magnates into transferring their allegiance to him.

William was deprived of his lands and titles and spent the next fifteen years in exile, until the accession of Henry II to power in place of Stephen in 1153–4. He was a close supporter of the Angevin cause, accompanying the Empress or her son on numerous occasions. He was present with Empress Matilda at Oxford in the summer of 1141, and shortly after at the siege of Winchester Castle. He remained in attendance on her at Devizes, witnessing the charter addressed to himself by which she granted Aston to Shrewsbury Abbey. In June 1153 he was present with Henry FitzEmpress, then Duke of Normandy, at Leicester. It was during this period that his younger brother, Walter, used the family's royal connections to make a new career in Scotland under David I of Scotland, an uncle of the Empress.

William's active support did not end with Henry's accession to the throne. In July 1155, when the king marched against Hugh de Mortimer, a turbulent Marcher lord who had been a key supporter of Stephen, and recaptured the castles at Shrewsbury and Bridgnorth, William FitzAlan was the chief beneficiary. At Bridgnorth 'the king restored his lands' and William there received the feudal homage of his tenants. Thus he regained his paternal fief. He was also restored as High Sheriff of Shropshire in 1155, holding the post until his death in 1160.

== Benefactor ==
It was probably between 1130 and 1138 that FitzAlan made the first recorded grant to Haughmond Abbey: a fishery at Preston Boats on the River Severn, near Shrewsbury. It is possible that there was a hermitage or a small religious community at Haughmond even in his father's time, and a small church from this earlier period has been revealed by excavations on the site, so it is not clear that William was the founder of the abbey. However, it was he who set it on a secure financial basis, with a series of important land grants in Shropshire and Sussex, which were reciprocated by other magnates in the region. Haughmond received lands from the Empress, confirmed by Stephen and Henry II. William continued to make benefactions to it when he returned from exile, including the wealthy portionary church of Wroxeter, declaring his intention to increase the number of priests there too. He also made grants to nearby Lilleshall Abbey, another Augustinian house. Though not the founder of Wombridge Priory, a smaller Augustinian house, he sanctioned its foundation by the Hadley family, his vassals. It was, however, Haughmond that became the FitzAlan shrine, with all heads of the family after William buried there for a century and a half.

== Death and burial ==
William died around Easter 1160. He was buried at Shrewsbury Abbey, according to Eyton, noted in the Haughmond Abbey history ("After William FitzAlan (I), who left his body for burial in Shrewsbury Abbey").

== Family and heritage ==
William's first wife was Christiana. She was the niece of Robert, 1st Earl of Gloucester, an illegitimate son of Henry I, and thus cousin to William Fitz Robert, 2nd Earl of Gloucester, who was a principal supporter of the Empress. She was the mother of his heir and other children.

- William's eldest son and heir was also called William FitzAlan.

- Christiana, their daughter married Hugh Pantulf, 4th Baron of Wem, a later High Sheriff of Shropshire.

His wife Christiana died before William regained his ancestral estates in 1155. Henry II therefore gave him the hand of Isabel de Say. She was the sole heiress of Helias de Say, who held the lordship of Clun and was an early benefactor of Haughmond Abbey. Clun was to pass to the FitzAlans on the death of Helias, but he outlived William, so it passed to his son, the second William. Isabel brought prestige as well as land.

The FitzAlans remained important Marcher lords and magnates in central England for several centuries. A strategic marriage with their Sussex neighbours, the d'Aubigny family, brought the FitzAlans the rich and important Earldom of Arundel. This they held from 1243 until 1580. It was as earls of Arundel that William FitzAlan's descendants made their most important mark on the history of England.

== In literature ==
The taking of Shrewsbury in 1138 by King Stephen, including the escape of William FitzAlan and the hanging of the supporters who did not escape, was the historical background for the novel One Corpse Too Many by Ellis Peters. Agents of FitzAlan are characters in a few of the later novels in The Cadfael Chronicles. The novel was adapted into the pilot episode of the TV series Cadfael, where FitzAlan (credited as "Fitzalan") is played by Michael Cadman.
