= The Pilgrim of Hate =

1984 novel by Ellis Peters

- First edition
- Author: Ellis Peters
- Series: The Cadfael Chronicles
- Genre: Mystery novel
- Publisher: Macmillan
- Publication date: 1984
- Media type: Print (Hardcover, Paperback) & audio book
- Pages: 192
- ISBN: 033338248X
- OCLC: 12879022
- Preceded by: Dead Man's Ransom
- Followed by: An Excellent Mystery

The Pilgrim of Hate is a medieval mystery novel by Ellis Peters, set in spring 1141. It is the tenth in the Cadfael Chronicles, and was first published in 1984.

This story takes place very soon after the preceding novel Dead Man's Ransom. Political events of The Anarchy are changing rapidly, with the crowned King Stephen held in prison, while the claimant Empress Maud tries to gain political and popular approval to replace him. Even in such troubled times, the Abbey holds the feast in honour of its own Saint Winifred, whose remains were taken (translated) from Wales four years earlier in the first of these tales, A Morbid Taste for Bones.

It was adapted for television in 1998 by Carlton Media for ITV.

== Plot summary ==
In 1141, the Abbey of St. Peter and St. Paul prepares to celebrate the anniversary of the translation of Saint Winifred's casket to Shrewsbury Abbey on 22 June.

Brother Cadfael shares a secret with Hugh Beringar, as he recalls what happened in Wales four years ago. Cadfael removed Winifred's remains from the casket, returned them to her Welsh soil and replaced them with the body of a monk who died on their mission to seek the holy bones. The saint has continued to work miracles in Wales, but not in Shrewsbury. Cadfael wants a sign that the saint is not displeased with him.

In early June, Abbot Radulfus returns from the legatine council called by Henry, Bishop of Winchester. The council ends with murder in Winchester when King Stephen's wife Queen Matilda asks the turncoat Henry to seek the King's release. Supporters of Empress Maud ambush the Queen's messenger, who is saved by the intervention of Rainald Bossard, a knight of the Empress, who is killed.

Among the pilgrims streaming into the Abbey is the widow Dame Alice Weaver with her crippled nephew Rhun and his sister, Melangell. Alice wants help for Rhun; Rhun wants a happier life for his sister. Two young men arrive with them. Ciaran is under vow to walk barefoot to Aberdaron in Wales to die in peace, hampered by a great iron cross around his neck and protected by a bishop's ring. His inseparable friend Matthew has vowed to be at Ciaran's side for the penitential journey. En route, Matthew gave aid to Rhun, and he likes Melangell. Cadfael sees a third party of pilgrims, four suspicious-looking merchants. With a tip from Brother Adam, Cadfael warns Beringar that they are thieves.

Setting a net to catch the thieves, Beringar meets Olivier de Bretagne, messenger from the Bishop's conference, whom Hugh first met when they worked together to save the Hugonin children. Olivier requests that Hugh accept Empress Maud as queen; Hugh politely refuses. Olivier's second mission is to search for Bossard's adopted son, Luc Meverel, who has been missing since the murder in April.

Beringar breaks up a crooked dice game, and recovers a ring stolen from Ciaran, which is found on the hand of local man Daniel Aurifaber, who bought it from Simeon Poer. Near dawn on the day of the procession, Ciaran tells Melangell that he is leaving Shrewsbury for Wales now that his "safe-passage" ring is returned to him. She promises to keep his secrets.

After St. Winifred's reliquary is set on her altar, pilgrims line up to make their requests of the saint. Prior Robert presides. As Rhun approaches, he drops his crutches; as he puts his foot to the ground and climbs to the altar, the congregation sees his leg become stronger and his foot untwist. He prays in complete silence; when he steps back, his foot whole and fully functional, and the church is filled with praise for the saint who has performed this miracle.

When Matthew cannot find Ciaran, Melangell tries to detain him. Matthew reacts with unusual violence, and leaves the Abbey, hot on Ciaran's trail.

Olivier and Hugh seek out Cadfael for help in finding Luc. The description of Luc applies to both Ciaran and Matthew. The Abbot learns they are both gone. Olivier leaves to search for them, on the road to Wales. Abbot Radulfus asks Cadfael if Rhun's recovery was feigned. Cadfael believes it was not. Radulfus, reassured of this miracle, speaks with Rhun, who states his wish to stay at the Abbey.

Melangell tells Cadfael that the two young men left separately, heading over the fields, not along the road. The Abbot opens a scrip left behind, finding a book with Luc Meverel's name in it. Sending word to Hugh, Cadfael goes on horseback to follow the two young men on the overland route. At the edge of twilight, he hears Ciaran and Matthew in a clearing around a great beech tree. Matthew is fighting off the three felons, who now await darkness. Cadfael, unarmed, approaches on foot, bellowing as if he is part of a large party in pursuit, and attacks Simeon Poer. His cries lead Hugh and his men to the scene, and they catch the three attackers.

In the brawl, Poer has pulled the cross off Ciaran's neck. Looking to Matthew, Ciaran says 'I am forfeit, now take me.' Cadfael agrees, understanding these men now. Matthew throws down his dagger and walks away with Olivier close behind. Ciaran, once in Bishop Henry's service, tells how he stabbed Bossard, wrongly believing that his master would condone the impulsive crime. Henry banished Ciaran, telling him to make his journey to Dublin on two conditions, with his life forfeit if he failed in either. Luc Meverel overheard these words, as he followed the attacker to the Bishop's house after Bossard died. Luc, motivated by grief turned to hate and vengeance, appoints himself enforcer of the vow.

Faced with the broken Ciaran, Luc turns away from vengeance. Hugh lets Ciaran walk away, to take up his issues with God on his own. Olivier returns with Luc/Matthew to Shrewsbury, where Luc again pays court to Melangell. He begins life anew with confession to the Abbot, and marriage to Melangell. Rhun stays at the Abbey as a prospective novice.

Olivier tells Cadfael that he and Ermina Hugonin were married this past Christmas, delighting Cadfael. Hugh arrives with the latest news from London: the Empress Maud has lost London, retreating to the southwest. The weight of the failure rests on her shoulders. The Queen's army remains in Kent. Olivier must leave Shrewsbury before he wanted.

Hugh says that Olivier resembles Cadfael in a way; the monk says, Oh, no, he is altogether the image of his mother. "I always meant to tell you, some day," he said tranquilly, "what he does not know, and never will from me. He is my son."

== Characters ==
- Brother Cadfael: He is the herbalist of the Benedictine Abbey of St. Peter and St. Paul at Shrewsbury, and its impromptu detective, about 61 years old.
- Rainald Bossard: A knight of Sir Laurence d'Angers company, about 50 years old. He supports the cause of Empress Maud, like his liege lord. Bossard's murder by persons unknown while defending Queen Matilda's messenger is the subject of the mystery.
- Bishop Henry: He is the Bishop of Winchester and the papal legate in England. The legate can confer the approval of the Church on the monarch. He is the brother of King Stephen and has been his staunch supporter. As the Empress's fortunes rise, Henry shifts his support away from his brother, sensing the political winds and hoping to increase his own power in the Church. He is a real historical person; his actions in this time of change set the scene for the story's action.
- Hugh Beringar: Newly made Sheriff of Shropshire. He is Cadfael's close friend. He took up the duty of Sheriff on the death of Sheriff Prestcote earlier in the spring in Dead Man's Ransom. Firmly in King Stephen's camp in this Anarchy; about 26 years old. He was introduced in One Corpse Too Many as the Deputy appointed by King Stephen. When Cadfael needs a confidant, Hugh is the one chosen and so chosen twice in this novel.
- Aline Beringar: Hugh's wife. She was the beautiful and gracious Aline Siward, wooed and won by Hugh in One Corpse Too Many. Their son Giles, just walking, is godson to Cadfael.
- Matthew: He is a pilgrim to the feast in honour of the translation of St. Winifred, determined to stay with Ciaran. En route, he befriended a family group of pilgrims, and falls in love with one of them. He is 24 or 25 years old, and educated to be a squire or clerk, though he never mentions this or his link to Ciaran: relation, friend, friend met en route?
- Ciaran: Pilgrim travelling with Matthew. He is bound by vow to go barefoot and encumbered by a heavy cross until he reaches his destination of Aberdaron in Wales, far beyond the Abbey. He is a very troubled soul. Like Matthew, he is educated to be a squire or clerk, and is of an age with him.
- Rhun: Pilgrim to this religious feast. He was crippled from childhood, and now 16 years old. He had a Welsh father and an English mother. He was raised in Wales until they died 7 years earlier, when his English aunt took him in.
- Melangell: His 18-year-old sister. She is dark-haired, attractive, of the age to marry and much in love with Matthew.
- Mistress Alice Weaver: She is the widowed sister of Melangell and Rhun's mother, who raised the pair since they were orphaned 7 years before. She took up her late husband's weaving trade to keep the family together. She is from Campden in the weaving district (Chipping Campden in the Cotswolds). She has hopes of help for Rhun, the reason to make the pilgrimage.
- Brother Adam of Reading: A fellow herbalist come on pilgrimage. He is unusual among the Benedictine monks for his knowledge of the world from his travels for his Abbot. He recognised one of the sharpers attracted to the crowds, telling Cadfael of the man's reputation. He met Matthew and Ciaran at the Abbey in Abingdon when he began his journey on horseback from Reading.
- Abbot Radulfus: Head of the Abbey of St. Peter and St. Paul. He is based on the real abbot of this time (Ranulf in some records). He is portrayed as a wise man, with authority in his bearing; he is taller than average, in excellent health, and a few years younger than Cadfael.
- Prior Robert Pennant: Of aristocratic background. He is fictional but based on a real man, who was Abbot after Radulfus. His ties to Saint Winifred's relics were strong. He wrote a history of her life. He is portrayed as aristocratic, not equally charitable to all comers.
- Brother Denis: The hospitaler of the Abbey.
- Brother Anselm: Precentor for the Abbey.
- Brother Oswin: Young monk in training under Brother Cadfael. He is over his initial clumsiness, but not yet so careful in maintaining the herbarium as Cadfael himself. He is about 21 years old, and was introduced in The Leper of Saint Giles.
- Simeon Poer, John Sure, Walter Baggot, and William Hales: They are a group of pilgrims; merchant, tailor, glover, and farrier, respectively, of the class who can go on pilgrimage almost as a vacation, or so they appear initially.
- Daniel Aurifaber: Townsman, local goldsmith. He likes to play dice with the visiting pilgrims, showing no improvement in his character or judgment. He was introduced in The Sanctuary Sparrow.
- Olivier de Bretagne: In service of Laurence d'Angers (who is for Empress Maud). He is sent as messenger from Bishop Henry and the Council at Winchester to encourage shires to join her side, and on his own errand seeking a missing young man. He was born in Antioch, son of a Syrian mother and Crusader father, where he was named Daoud. When he was baptised into the faith of his unknown father, he took the name of his godfather, a man in the same Crusader service. He was introduced in The Virgin in the Ice.

== Historical background and continuity ==
This novel, like the rest of the series, is set during The Anarchy, a civil war which raged through England from 1135 to 1154. During the course of the story, King Stephen, having been captured by Robert of Gloucester at the Battle of Lincoln (February 1141), is now imprisoned in Bristol by the Empress Maud. The plot, which takes place in June 1141, also details the unsuccessful attempt by Maud and her brother Robert to have her crowned in London, where she took the title Lady of the English, one step before coronation. She was chased out by the Londoners before she could be crowned Queen. As this novel explains, Maud made herself extremely unpopular by the strictures of her government, her arrogant disposition, and her demands for money. Queen Matilda, wife of King Stephen, takes over the leadership of his armies while her husband is imprisoned, and does well in keeping up the pressure against the forces of the Empress.

The story describes a miracle, manifest before the brothers and the faithful pilgrims. This era of English religious belief included widespread belief in miracles, attributed to the power of a saint's intercession and the belief of the person benefitting from the miracle. Amidst the chaos of the royalty and the landed aristocracy, the miracle was believed, even sought, for the lives of everyday people.

The events take place in real places in England. Shrewsbury Abbey is real, and is from 180 to 200 miles on modern roads from Winchester. It is over 160 miles on modern roads from Reading. Abingdon is about 35 miles along the way to Shrewsbury in Shropshire. Rhun, Melangell and their aunt are from Campden in the Cotswolds wool district, over 80 miles from Shrewsbury. Ciaran has the ambitious plan to walk to Aberdaron in Wales, which is over 100 miles on modern roads from Shrewsbury. Bishop Henry of Winchester gathered his bishops and abbots in Winchester for the legatine council, while the Empress Maud was in London and Oxford in the time of this story.

As he promised in the previous novel, Dead Man's Ransom, Hugh Beringar took Caus Castle from the Welsh of Powys, so it could no longer be used as a base for raids into Shropshire. Done in April, it was not soon enough for the nearby farms and asarts to be resettled.

The next novel in the series, An Excellent Mystery, details Maud's retreat to Winchester, where she was besieged and routed, and her legendary escape from snowbound Oxford in 1142 is mentioned at the start of a later novel, The Confession of Brother Haluin.

Besides its setting at a crucial moment of the progress of the civil war, this novel ties to events and characters in earlier novels, and sets the scene for those in later novels. The religious festival is keyed on the events of the first novel, A Morbid Taste for Bones, carrying (translating) the holy relics from Wales to the Abbey. The son Cadfael never knew he had until their encounter in The Virgin in the Ice returns to him by the chances of the political events. The neutrality of this monk in the political scene is strengthened by the contrast between the two young men now most important in Cadfael's life—his son Olivier and Sheriff Hugh Beringar. Each is aligned for different reasons with opposite sides in this conflict. Not all clerics or monastics in that era were neutral, of course, highlighted by the actions of King Stephen's brother, Henry, Bishop of Winchester.

== Publication history ==
This book was first published in the UK in September 1984 by Macmillan. The US hardback edition followed in November 1985. Two large print editions were released, one in 1986 and the second in 2000. Eight paperback editions were issued in the US and the UK, beginning in September 1985 by Sphere in the UK. The latest was issued in the US by Thorndike in September 1999, followed by a large print soft cover edition in the UK by Chivers in 2000.

Twelve audiobooks on cassette or CD have been released, by various readers, including Sir Derek Jacobi, Stephen Thorne, Roe Kendall, Vanessa Benjamin. The first was a cassette edition in 1989. Most recently, Blackstone Audio Books issued it on CD in May 2013.

It has been published in other languages besides English.

- French: Le pèlerin de la haine, Published 1991 by Editions 10/18, 279 pages ISBN 9782264015266
- Italian: Il pellegrino dell'odio (Hardcover), Published 1994 by Longanesi, 221 pages, Elsa Pelitti (Translator) ISBN 9788830412019
- German: Pilger des Hasses (Chronicles of Brother Cadfael #10), Published 1992 by Heyne Verlag, Paperback, 267 pages ISBN 9783453053113
- Dutch: Een wisse dood [Certain death] (Paperback) Published 1990 by De Boekerij Paperback, 192 pages Pieter Janssens (Translator) ISBN 9789022510094

== Television adaptation ==
The Pilgrim of Hate was adapted by Carlton Media and WGBH Boston for ITV as the last episode of the fourth season of Brother Cadfael. This episode departs from the novel in significant ways.

In this version, a well-aged corpse is found in the baggage of the pilgrims on St. Winifred's day, and its identity, not the murder of a faraway knight, becomes the subject of the mystery. Matthew (here named Luc) and Ciaran are brothers, pointing fingers as to who is responsible for their father's death. In this adaptation Matthew turns out to be the villain. Crippled Rhun (here named Walter), far from being one of Cadfael's most promising future novices, confirms Father Abbot's suspicions that he is only faking his condition to earn the charity of those around him; his sister Melangell has been forced by guilt to wait on him hand and foot, even stealing to support their needs. "Only Cadfael," says one cynical reviewer, "is still interested in the truth, even if it disarranges the plans of any of these unsympathetic characters."

Filmed on location in Hungary, this episode starred Sir Derek Jacobi as Cadfael. It aired on 28 December 1998, and was the last of Ellis Peters' novels to be adapted for the screen.
