= An Excellent Mystery =

1985 novel by Ellis Peters

- First edition
- Author: Ellis Peters
- Language: English
- Series: The Cadfael Chronicles
- Genre: Mystery novel
- Publisher: Macmillan
- Publication date: 20 June 1985
- Publication place: United Kingdom
- Media type: Print (Hardback)
- Pages: 192 pp
- ISBN: 0-333-39313-9
- OCLC: 12808427
- Preceded by: The Pilgrim of Hate
- Followed by: The Raven in the Foregate

An Excellent Mystery is a mystery novel by Ellis Peters, the third of four set in the year 1141, when so much occurred in the period known as the Anarchy. It is the 11th in the Cadfael Chronicles, published in 1985.

The siege of Winchester sends monks streaming across England seeking safe haven. Two arrive at Shrewsbury Abbey. A young man seeks out the older of the two monks, wanting his approval to marry a young woman once meant for another, and she cannot be found. His quest begins.

== Plot introduction ==
News comes slowly to the Abbey of Saint Peter and Saint Paul from the battles in the south between the imprisoned King Stephen and the Empress Maud besieged in Winchester. Empress Maud wants to regain the support of Henry, Bishop of Winchester, but the canny bishop will not side with her again after the failure of his legatine council. Rather he is building up his own stores at Wolvesey Castle in Winchester in case he is besieged, and rebuilding his alliance with Queen Matilda, now leading King Stephen's armies. In Winchester, battle begins, with the Bishop's forces shooting fire arrows. The Abbey of Hyde-Mead in Winchester is laid waste, dispersing the surviving monks.

== Plot summary ==
In this hot, dry August 1141, Cadfael brings Brother Oswin to his term at the leper house at Saint Giles. Two monks arrive at Shrewsbury Abbey, Brother Humilis and the mute, young Brother Fidelis as refugees from Abbey of Hyde-Mead. Humilis came so far because he was born nearby. Cadfael recognizes Humilis as local man Godfrid Marescot, who joined the Crusades years earlier, gaining a reputation for valour. Hugh Beringar sees that the man is ill and not long for this world. Cadfael finds Humilis collapsed over his writing desk. Cadfael sees the severity of the old wound, which left him unable to father children.

Brother Urien makes a sexual advance towards young Rhun, but is rejected. Rhun is thus aware of the troubled Brother Urien. Two days later, Rhun begins formally as a novice with a tonsure, a Brother. A week or so later, Brother Urien makes an advance towards Brother Fidelis. Fidelis rejects him.

Nicholas Harnage arrives on leave from the Queen's army, to visit his leader in the Crusades. He wants to propose marriage to Julian Cruce. She was once betrothed to Humilis/Godfrid, but freed by him upon his return as a wounded man. Nicholas met her once, when he delivered this news three years earlier. Humilis consents, so Nicholas begins his quest for the lady.

Nicholas's quest brings him first to her family home; then to the convent at Wherwell, which she planned to join after Godfrid ended the betrothal; back to the family home to learn of the men who escorted her; to Winchester, with the Bishop's blessing, to seek the goods she carried as a gift to the convent that never heard word of her; each time returning to Shrewsbury Abbey with his news. He fears for her life when Wherwell Abbey is burned, and again when the jeweller who purchased her personal jewelry from the servant says the servant reported the lady as dead. On that news, her brother Reginald agrees to aid Nicholas. Hugh agrees to seek the missing escort Adam Heriet, a man-at-arms since the overlord called for more men from Reginald. In his travels, Nicholas witnesses the rout of Winchester. The Empress broke out of the siege, marching out at dawn along the Stockbridge road, now pursued by the Queen's army, which takes Robert of Gloucester at Stockbridge. He is held in Rochester. In the rout, the Empress escapes with her life.

Hugh finds Heriet at his sister's home. Heriet let Julian travel the last mile on her own at her request. He has no knowledge of her in the three years since. Hugh returns to Shrewsbury with Heriet. Heriet recalls Julian's happy expectation of her marriage to Godfrid, in her youth. Brother Humilis is in the infirmary where Cadfael and Brother Fidelis tend him. Hugh tells Humilis what he has learned and Heriet recounts his story. Heriet denies robbing and killing Julian, and agrees to stay in a castle cell.

Alone with Cadfael and Hugh, Brother Humilis asks about the valuables that disappeared with Julian. Hugh describes them. Brother Urien overhears and thinks one item is worn by Brother Fidelis, giving Urien reason to approach again. Angered by rejection, Urien pulls the chain to see what hangs on it. In doing so, he discovers that Fidelis is not a young man, but a young woman. He threatens to expose Fidelis unless Fidelis agrees to give herself to him within three days. Rhun meets Urien on his way out, and senses that something explosive has occurred. To protect Fidelis, Rhun suggests to Brother Edmund that Fidelis sleep in Brother Humilis's room. That night, Humilis wakes to discover his friend on the cot. He sees an old gold ring on the chain around his neck. Thus Brother Humilis confirms the truth about his faithful mute companion. Fidelis is actually Julian Cruce.

Humilis asks Cadfael to protect Brother Fidelis after Humilis dies. Humilis then asks that he and Fidelis visit his childhood home. They travel by the river, for less exertion. Cadfael enlists Aline's assistance for his plans. Then Cadfael recruits Madog and his skiff for their journey next day to the manor upriver at Salton. At the manor, Humilis speaks warmly to Fidelis of his gratitude and love for all the care in his last years. Returning to the Abbey, they are caught in heavy rains. They are undone by lightning that strikes a huge willow, which falls to knock their skiff to pieces. Fidelis comes up for air, sees Humilis, holds him up. Madog takes Humilis to shore, tries to revive him, as Fidelis washes up alive at the same place. Realising Humilis is dead, Fidelis keens in deep pain.

Madog meets Cadfael alone at the mill. Relating how Humilis died in the river, he asks how to deal with the surprise uncovered in the disaster. Cadfael says their story is that Fidelis died in the river with Humilis, body never found. Cadfael proceeds to Aline. They ride along the river on horseback to care for the survivor.

Hugh and Nicholas accuse Adam Heriet of the lady Julian's murder. Heriet sticks to his story. News of the river deaths interrupts the interrogation. Hugh and Nicholas see Brother Humilis's body being carried to the Abbey. Madog recounts the accident to Abbott Radulfus, who sorrowfully accepts all he says. Hugh notices Cadfael's absence. Once home, Aline tells Hugh what has happened. Cadfael will return their horse; Hugh sets Adam Heriet at ease about Lady Julian.

Brother Humilis is laid to rest in the Abbey transept. Reginald Cruce recalls another ring that meant much to his sister, Godfrid's betrothal gift, a gold ring from his family. She wore it on a chain around her neck. This is what Godfrid saw just before his death.

Just after the ceremony, Sister Magdalene of Godric's Ford Benedictine cell arrives with a letter addressed to Hugh from Lady Julian, now at Polesworth Abbey. Lady Julian had not felt a true vocation so went instead to Sopwell Priory without taking vows. Hearing the rumors that she was 'done to death for gain,' she asks for an escort to fetch her to Shrewsbury. Reginald is joyous that his sister is alive and repentant of having wronged Adam Heriet. Nicholas is stunned and pleased.

Brothers Rhun and Urien are both at the river side, one in grief and the latter in despair. Urien speaks of confessing and facing retribution for what he did. Rhun persuades him to keep Fidelis's secret between the two of them for the sake of Fidelis. Rhun realises that Fidelis is Julian Cruce, in many ways back from the dead. Two days later, Lady Julian arrives for the Mass said in honor of the lost brothers, walking unrecognized past the men with whom she had lived for weeks. She wore the gold ring on her finger, and was dressed by Aline and Sister Magdalene to hide her tonsure. Nicholas and Julian meet. Nicholas is still in love with her. Julian asks him to visit her at her brother's manor.

Cadfael is relieved to avoid the scandal it would have been to the order, both Abbeys, and Lady Julian, had the truth come out. Hugh reflects on Heriet's true devotion. Cadfael recalls his journey to Sister Magdalene with Fidelis/Julian. Sister Magdalene notes that the letter she wrote for Julian had no lies, just a few deceptions, and praises the wisdom of Julian's decision to assume muteness in her time as Fidelis, as one who cannot speak, cannot lie.

The novel concludes with a quote from the solemnization of matrimony, taken from the Book of Common Prayer.

== Characters ==
- Brother Cadfael: Benedictine monk and herbalist for Shrewsbury Abbey of Saint Peter and Saint Paul at Shrewsbury, Shropshire. He is about 61 years old in this novel.
- Hugh Beringar: Lord Sheriff of Shropshire. He is a loyal servant to King Stephen and close friend to Cadfael. He is accomplished but young, about 26 years old in this story. He was introduced in One Corpse Too Many.
- Brother Humilis: Once Godfrid Marescot, he is a noble crusader who suffered crippling wounds at the end of twelve years service in the holy wars. He was betrothed to the lady Julian before the Crusade, when the duty of having sons fell unexpectedly on this second son. He released her from that bond upon his return to England and entry into the Benedictine abbey of Hyde-Mead near Winchester three years before the story begins; age 46.
- Brother Fidelis: He is a mute, young monk who arrives with Humilis at the Shrewsbury Abbey following the destruction of their abbey at Hyde-Mead in the wars. Fidelis tends to Brother Humilis at Shrewsbury, as he did at Hyde-Mead since his arrival there after Humilis took his vows.
- Brother Rhun: He is young novice, 16 years old, joyous at life with full health from a miracle by Saint Winifred, as described in The Pilgrim of Hate. He shows kindness and insight to Brothers Urien and Fidelis, with great understanding for his age. He has been in the monastery since he was cured, and was allowed begin as a novice, take the tonsure and the title Brother, once at the Abbey about two months.
- Brother Urien: He is a monk nearly a year. He is 37 years old. He joined following a disastrous marriage to a woman who left him. Deeply frustrated by his passionate character, he is driven to pursue both Rhun and Fidelis.
- Lady Julian Cruce: Daughter of the late Humphrey Cruce at Lai. She was betrothed to Godfrid Marescot when she was 5, before he left for his 10-year vow of service in the Crusade that stretched to 12 or 13 years when he returned and released her from the engagement as he entered a monastery. She was the only daughter and only child of her father's second marriage.
- Reginald Cruce: He is the half-brother of Julian, 17 years older, who inherited their father's manor at Lai in Shropshire upon his death about 3 years earlier. he is married with children. He has not seen her since her childhood, did not write to her once she left the family home. informed of her never arriving at the nunnery she chose, he does show concern for her.
- Adam Heriet: He was a huntsman at the Cruce manor at Lai, now past 50. He was sent by Reginald when his overlord, Waleran de Meulan, requested men at arms for the wars in England soon after Julian left home. He is visiting his sister and godson in Brigge when the story opens, in a lull in the battles.
- Nicholas Harnage: He was once a squire of Godfrid Marescot. He fought under him in the Crusade and came home with Godfrid when he was wounded; in his mid twenties. He is now a soldier in the Queen's army (King Stephen's side). He bore the news to the lady Julian 3 years earlier from Godfrid. His interest in finding her reveals her absence from the nunnery, and starts the mystery.
- Henry, Bishop of Winchester: He is an actor in the politics of 1141, turning his support from his brother King Stephen, to the Empress, and back to his brother. Young Harnage seeks him out for support in his quest to find the Lady Julian, whose last traces were in Winchester. He is a real historical person.
- Sister Magdalen: She is a Benedictine sister at Godric's Ford, a cell of the mother house at Polesworth. She is a longtime friend of Brother Cadfael. She was introduced in The Leper of Saint Giles.
- Aline Beringar: She is the wife of Hugh Beringar, and mother to Cadfael's godson, Giles. Introduced in One Corpse Too Many.
- Madog of the dead-boat: He is a Welsh fisherman and ferry man, skilled in every turn of the Severn River, and thus finds its dead as well serving the living.
- Brother Oswin: He is a young monk who has been Cadfael's assistant since Brother Mark moved on. Oswin moves out to the leper house at Saint Giles, using the knowledge he gained in his training and leaving Cadfael without an assistant for a while. He was introduced in The Leper of Saint Giles.

== Reviews ==
Kirkus Reviews finds this a superbly crafted story, with a mystery that tests Cadfael and keeps the reader's attention to the resolution.

Library Journal, reviewing an audio version read by Stephen Thorne, has praise for the narrator in making medieval language sound natural.

CBS Interactive Business Solutions reprints a review of An Excellent Mystery written by Linda Bridges, originally published in "National Review" 5 December 1986. The review is on the whole favourable, praising Ellis Peters' use of strong yet feminine characters and the character of Cadfael as an original detective. The review closes with the recommendation that the book be read as part of the Cadfael series.

== Historical setting ==
The events in An Excellent Mystery take place in August 1141 during the civil war between King Stephen and Empress Maud, known as the Anarchy. The burning of Winchester, the abbey at Wherwell and of Andover, are real events important to the plot of the novel. King Stephen is imprisoned.

His wife Queen Matilda leads his armies (the Queen's army in this novel) with good skill and presses for his exchange. Henry Bishop of Winchester was younger brother to King Stephen, and like him, cousin to Empress Maud.

Fortunes turned at the rout of Winchester with the taking of the Empress's strongest ally by Queen Matilda's army. Robert of Gloucester was taken at Stockbridge, then held in Rochester. In the rout, the Empress escaped with her life and her forces were scattered.

Fictional events rely in detail on the historical. The two monks arrive in Shrewsbury from the Abbey of Hyde-Mead because it had burned completely in the start of the battles in Winchester. Hugh Beringar's pursuit of Adam Heriet is made easy because it occurs in the time after the Rout of Winchester, when armies are scattered, a lull in the battles while negotiations begin for the exchange of the King imprisoned seven months, and the newly-taken Robert of Gloucester. Heriet is on leave for a visit with his family. Searching for news of Julian, Nicholas rides past the scene of that same battle, sharing the news with the Abbott, the Sheriff and Cadfael in Shrewsbury.

The Abbey is in Shropshire in England. The real towns of Shrewsbury and Winchester (in Hampshire) are used as locations for much of the story's action. The manor of the de Marescot family was set upriver of Frankwell along the River Severn. Harnage's travels seeking the Lady Julian take him to Romsey Abbey, about 200 miles south on modern roads from Shrewsbury, and near Winchester. He journeyed to Wherwell Abbey in Hampshire, about 175 miles on modern roads from Shrewsbury. He stops twice at Lai, one of several manors of the Cruce family in the shire, presumably close to Ightfield (another of the family's manors) about 20 miles northeast of Shrewsbury on modern roads. The last stopping place before reaching the Abbey of Saint Peter and Saint Paul for the two monks from Hyde-Mead Abbey is Brigge, a market town with a bridge over the River Severn, about 20–27 miles from Shrewsbury on modern roads. Lady Julian Cruce waited at Polesworth Abbey, the mother house for the Godric's Ford cell of nuns. That real nunnery (until the dissolution of the monasteries) is about 60 miles on modern roads from Shrewsbury, so it was prudent for her to request an escort to return to her family home. Lai appears in Domesday Book and is now one of the lost manors of Shropshire; its actual location is uncertain. Ightfield also appears in the Domesday Book for Shropshire.

At the opening of the novel, Lammas Day and Loaf Mass are mentioned as having been well-timed to the actual harvest from the good growing weather up to the start of August. The first of August did mark the expected time of the wheat harvest before the calendar change in the 18th century. The success of the three-day Saint Peter's Fair of this year is also mentioned.

In this and other novels of the series, Cadfael makes wine for his guests. In the 12th century, this was possible, vineyards in southern England. This reflects the warmer climate in northern Europe, described in the Medieval Warm Period, Wine from the United Kingdom and one other source.

== Allusions to other works ==
The novel's title comes from the Book of Common Prayer and the specific prayer, the solemnisation of matrimony, is quoted directly at the novel's conclusion. The author who avoids irony adds a touch of it with this quote, as the Book of Common Prayer came after Henry VIII split from the Roman Catholic church that dominated in the 12th Century, the setting of the novel. The quote is found in the 1559 version but not in more recent versions made available on line. It is found in this 1662 version said to apply in the era of Jane Austen's novels in the early 19th century.

"Oh God, Who hast consecrated this state of matrimony to such an excellent mystery, look mercifully on these Thy servants."

== Major themes ==
Marriage is the major theme of An Excellent Mystery as reflected in the title, which is taken from a prayer used at wedding services. Although the marriage of Godfrid and Julian could not be consummated because of his wounds and her disguise, she had "his company, the care of him, the secrets of his body, as intimate as ever was marriage - his love, far beyond the common claims of marriage."

The power of love shared in goodness for the other, and the perversion of love, in the hands of one who does not understand this, is a major theme. The perversion is shown in the confusion of the mind of Brother Urien, consumed by the passion of love, seeking his own needs and not those of the one he purports to love, from the wife who left him to the young brothers in the Abbey he approaches. The power of love shared for the benefit of the loved one is shown in many characters, including Brother Fidelis, Nicholas, Hugh and his wife Aline, Brother Rhun, and always, Brother Cadfael.

This novel is unique among the Brother Cadfael series in that no one of the major characters is killed - although it is believed through most of the novel that the Lady Julian has been murdered. It is set in a time of brutal killing of non-combatants in the conflict over who should rule England, setting fire to a monastery and convent at Winchester and the convent at Wherwell while their residents yet lived there.

== Film, TV or theatrical adaptations ==
Although there have been BBC Radio adaptations and TV adaptations of many of the Cadfael stories, An Excellent Mystery has not been featured amongst them.

== Publication history ==
Following is a list of four editions in hardback, eight in paperback, and nine audio books, published in the UK and the US in English. A Kindle edition is also available, issued in July 2013, ISBN B00DUPVR7C, Publisher Velmon Books.

- 1985, UK, Macmillan, ISBN 0-333-39313-9 / ISBN 978-0-333-39313-0, June 1985, Hardback
- 1986, US, William Morrow & Co, ISBN 0-688-06250-4 / ISBN 978-0-688-06250-7, June 1986, Hardback
- 1986, UK, Time Warner Paperbacks, ISBN 0-7515-0221-9 / ISBN 978-0-7515-0221-3, June 1986, Paperback
- 1987, US, Fawcett, ISBN 0-449-21224-6 / ISBN 978-0-449-21224-0, June 1987, Paperback
- 1987, UK, Ulverscoft Large Print Books, ISBN 0-7089-1660-0 / ISBN 978-0-7089-1660-5, July 1987, Hardback
- 1991, UK, Time Warner Paperbacks, ISBN 0-7088-2867-1 / ISBN 978-0-7088-2867-0, March 1991, Paperback
- 1993, UK, Listen for Pleasure, ISBN 1-85848-221-6 / ISBN 978-1-85848-221-7 Audio cassette
- 1993, UK, Chivers Audio Books, ISBN 0-7451-4184-6 / ISBN 978-0-7451-4184-8, August 1991, Audio Cassette
- 1994, UK, Time Warner Paperbacks, ISBN 0-7515-1111-0 / ISBN 978-0-7515-1111-6, May 1994, Paperback
- 1997, UK, Futura, ISBN 0-7088-1111-6 / ISBN 978-0-7088-1111-5, January 1997, Paperback
- 1997, US, Mysterious Press, ISBN 0-446-40532-9 / ISBN 978-0-446-40532-4, October 1997, Paperback
- 2000, US, Thorndike Press, ISBN 0-7862-2269-7 / ISBN 978-0-7862-2269-8, March 2000, Paperback
- 2000, UK, Chivers Large Print, ISBN 0-7540-1366-9 / ISBN 978-0-7540-1366-2, April 2000, Hardback
- 2000, USA, The Audio Partners, ISBN 1-57270-140-4 / ISBN 978-1-57270-140-3, April 2000, Audio Cassette
- 2000, UK, Hodder & Stoughton Audio Books, ISBN 1-84032-312-4 / ISBN 978-1-84032-312-2, October 2000, Audio Cassette
- 2001, UK, Chivers Large Print, ISBN 0-7540-2273-0 / ISBN 978-0-7540-2273-2, January 2001, Paperback
- 2001, USA, Blackstone Audiobooks, ISBN 0-7861-9780-3 / ISBN 978-0-7861-9780-4, February 2001, Audio CD
- 2001, USA, Blackstone Audiobooks, ISBN 0-7861-1940-3 / ISBN 978-0-7861-1940-0, February 2001, Audio Cassette
- 2005, USA, Hodder & Stoughton, ISBN 1-84456-123-2 / ISBN 978-1-84456-123-0, December 2005, Audio CD
- 2012 Blackstone Audiobooks, ISBN 1-4551-2458-3 / ISBN 978-1-4551-2458-9, February 2012, MP3 CD audio book

The novel has been translated and published in French, Italian, German, Dutch, Portuguese, and Polish.

- French: Un insondable mystère [An unfathomable mystery] (Frère Cadfael, #11), Published 2002 by 10/18, Mass Market Paperback, ISBN 978-2-264-03308-6)
- Italian: Mistero doppio [Double Mystery], Published 1995 by Longanesi, Hardcover, 230 pages, Elsa Pelitti (Translator), ISBN 978-88-304-1271-2)
- German: Ein ganz besonderer Fall [A Very Special Case] (Chronicles of Brother Cadfael, #11), Published 1990 by Heyne, Paperback, 252 pages ISBN 978-3-453-03705-2)
- Dutch: Een hard gelag [It cost him dearly] (Paperback), Published 1990 by De Boekerij, Paperback, 204 pages, Pieter Janssens (Translator), ISBN 978-90-225-1061-2)
- Portuguese: Mistério na Abadia [Mystery at the Abbey] (Chronicles of Brother Cadfael #11), Published 1996 by Record, Paperback, 254 pages, Luiz Carlos do Nascimento Silva (Translator), ISBN 978-85-01-04443-3)
- Polish: Doskonała tajemnica (Kroniki brata Cadfaela, #11), Published 2004 by Zysk i S-ka, Paperback, Irena Doleżal-Nowicka (Translator), 222 pages, ISBN 978-83-7298-265-0)

It is found in Spanish and also in Polish (above) on the shelves of libraries listed in WorldCat.

- Spanish: Un misterio excelente, Publisher Debolsillo 2002, Series Jet (Barcelona), 457/11, Book 1a. ed. en bolsillo (paperback), María Antonia Menini (Translator), ISBN 84-9759-169-0, ISBN 978-84-9759-169-0
