= The Virgin in the Ice =

1982 book by Ellis Peters

- First edition
- Author: Ellis Peters
- Series: The Cadfael Chronicles
- Genre: Mystery novel
- Publisher: Macmillan
- Publication date: 1982
- Media type: Print (Hardcover, Paperback) & audio book
- Pages: 224
- ISBN: 0-333-32914-7
- OCLC: 12522294
- Preceded by: The Leper of Saint Giles
- Followed by: The Sanctuary Sparrow

The Virgin in the Ice is a medieval mystery novel by Ellis Peters, set in late 1139. It is the sixth novel in The Cadfael Chronicles, first published in 1982 (1982 in literature).

It was adapted for radio by BBC Radio 4 in 1992 and for television in 1995 by Central for ITV.

The novel is set in actual locations in England during the Anarchy, the period of civil war between King Stephen and Empress Maude. The wars and disorder allow marauders with no loyalty to either faction to pillage and burn.

Reviews at the time of publication were generally positive. The plot was commended, as Cadfael did his "usual astute detective work" as was the historical detail, "Peters' reliable medieval performance as always", but "the formula is starting to show slight signs of fatigue." The novel was expected to appeal to mystery fans and history buffs, yet "The mystery itself eventually yields to the clamour of civil war". Another said it "ranks as a favourite in the series."

== Plot summary ==
In November 1139, the Empress's armies have attacked and pillaged Worcester. Among those who fled the city were two noble children in the Benedictine Order's care and a nun. They have vanished. The children's uncle and guardian, a supporter of the Empress, is refused permission to enter the King's lands to search for them.

As the first snowstorms of winter sweep the countryside, Brother Cadfael of Shrewsbury Abbey goes to the Benedictine Priory at Bromfield near Ludlow to treat a monk who has been attacked and left for dead. The injured Brother, Elyas, babbles about a party of refugees who might well be those sought. Cadfael sends word to Shrewsbury and rides into the snow-covered countryside to search for them. He finds one, the boy Yves Hugonin, sheltering with a forester. As they ride to Bromfield, Yves tells Cadfael that his headstrong sister Ermina eloped four nights previously, and he became lost in the woods when he tried to pursue them.

As they cross a frozen stream, Cadfael sees the body of a young woman frozen into the ice. Fearing it is that of Ermina, he conceals his discovery from Yves. Joined by his friend, Deputy Sheriff Hugh Beringar, he retrieves the body from the ice. It does not match the description of Ermina; Yves identifies it as Ermina's tutor, Sister Hilaria.

The smallholding where Hilaria and the children had sheltered has been attacked and destroyed by brigands, although the smallholder is safe at nearby Cleeton. His place was destroyed on the night of the first heavy snow. Sister Hilaria had left with Brother Elyas a few hours before. Beringar also hears of a dark, armed stranger dressed as a commoner who has been enquiring after the Hugonin children.

The king's retainer in Ludlow tells Beringar that the brigands have attacked other isolated settlements, committing indiscriminate murder. Cadfael surmises that Elyas and Hilaria were two of their chance victims. One of the destroyed settlements was the manor of Callowleas, which belonged to Evrard Boterel, Ermina's suitor. He and Ermina fled to Ledwyche, another manor he held. He relates that Ermina, concerned for her brother, left to search for him. Boterel rode after her, but collapsed from a knife wound in the shoulder.

Overnight, another snowstorm blows up. When Yves tells Elyas that Hilaria is dead, he becomes distressed and walks purposefully out of the priory. Yves fails to turn him back. They reach a shepherd's hut, where Elyas appears to confess to Hilaria's murder. As dawn approaches, Yves hears noises nearby and goes to seek help, but runs into the arms of the brigands, who take him prisoner. He contrives to leave a trail of wine drops in the new-fallen snow.

At the same time, Ermina appears at Bromfield, accompanied by a stranger who immediately vanishes. She is filled with remorse that her reckless conduct led indirectly to Hilaria's death, but Cadfael insists that the guilt belongs to the murderer. She tells Cadfael that the stranger is Olivier de Bretagne, a Syrian-born squire in her uncle's service, with whom she is clearly in love.

Cadfael wonders why Elyas was first attacked more than a mile from where Hilaria's body was found. Near the stream, he finds the shepherd's hut. Inside he discovers Elyas's cloak and Hilaria's blood-stained habit and wimple. Casting about, he finds the trail of Yves and the bandits, and follows it to the brigands' fort on Titterstone Clee Hill.

Cadfael guides Beringar's armed men to the fort. They attack, but the brigands' leader le Gaucher forces them to withdraw by threatening Yves. As night falls, Olivier de Bretagne enters the fort by stealth and overcomes the brigand guarding Yves on the tower. They cannot escape but Yves realises that Beringar and Cadfael must be nearby and raises a racket to alert them. Beringar and his men attack again, and set fire to the fort. As the fire threatens them, Yves and Olivier try to break out but Yves collides with le Gaucher and is taken hostage again. Brother Elyas wanders into the battle and confronts le Gaucher who, unnerved by the sight of a man he had left for dead, lets go of Yves. Olivier then kills le Gaucher in single combat before disappearing. The leaderless brigands are captured or killed.

At Bromfield, Yves tells Cadfael of Elyas's apparent confession but Cadfael realises that when Elyas and Hilaria sheltered together in the hut, Elyas, tormented by desire, left her alone but with his cloak for warmth. He then fell victim to the brigands. His failure to protect Hilaria has tortured Elyas but Cadfael reassures him that he did all for the best.

Evrard Boterel arrives at Bromfield. Cadfael invites him into the chapel where Hilaria awaits burial. Dressed in Hilaria's wimple and habit, Ermina confronts Evrard, forcing a startled confession from him. She then tells Cadfael and Beringar that she turned against Boterel when he fled Callowleas rather than defend his people. At Ledwyche, he tried to take her by force but she wounded him with a knife, and ran into the woods. She saw Boterel ride out and return with his wound opened. Boterel confesses his crime. He came upon Sister Hilaria in the hut, raped her and smothered her to stop her screams.

Ermina tells Cadfael that Olivier will come for her and Yves after Compline. When Olivier arrives, Cadfael suggests waiting until Matins, when they can leave undetected. Olivier tells of his early years in Syria and of his mother, Mariam. Cadfael realises that Olivier is his own son. Elyas is recovering his peace of mind, Hilaria's murderer is in prison, the brigands are exterminated, and Yves and Ermina are on their way to their uncle's care. With their tasks accomplished, Beringar and Cadfael return to Shrewsbury, with Cadfael dazed.

== Characters ==
- Brother Cadfael: Benedictine monk at Shrewsbury Abbey. In his youth, he has been on Crusade as a man at arms, has been a seaman and lived for some years in Syria near Antioch, but a monk since he was about 40; now nearing 60 years old. He is the herbalist in the monastery.
- Hugh Beringar: Deputy Sheriff of Shropshire. He and his wife take a house in town so he can better cover the south of the shire in this time of unrest, and be nearer friends when their child is born. He thinks much like Cadfael despite his youth, about 24 years old. They are good friends. He is wiry, not tall, with dark hair and eyes, and an expressive eyebrow. Hugh was introduced in One Corpse Too Many.
- Aline Beringar: Wife of Hugh. She is about 20 years old, and begins the story about to have her first child. The blonde haired boy Giles is born on 5 December, thus introduced in this book. She was introduced in One Corpse Too Many.
- Gilbert Prestcote: Sheriff of Shropshire, King Stephen's man. He moves to the north of the shire for the month of the Christmas feast, requiring his deputy to come down to Shrewsbury.
- Sub-Prior Herward: Brother from the Benedictine Abbey at Worcester. He rode to Shrewsbury in search of the Hugonin children, gaining the Sheriff's promise to look for them.
- Prior Leonard: Benedictine monk in authority at the Priory at Bromfield. He was at Shrewsbury Abbey before his promotion, where he became friends with Cadfael and familiar with his skills in the healing arts.
- Reyner Dutton: Tenant to the Bromfield Priory. He found Brother Elyas, near death. Later, he showed Cadfael the place, leading them to discover the hidden bundles of clothing in the hut.
- Brother Elyas: Recently widowed monk in his 30s. He joined the Benedictine abbey at Pershore in search of peace in his life. He is a tall, strong man.
- Ermina Hugonin: She is a beautiful 17-year-old girl of the nobility. She is orphaned, living in the Benedictine convent at Worcester for her education. She is quick-witted and of strong will.
- Yves Hugonin: Younger brother to Ermina, and son of the late Geoffrey Hugonin. He was living in the Benedictine abbey at Worcester for his education until the rout of Worcester. He is a 13-year-old boy of the nobility.
- Sister Hilaria: She is a young, blond, beautiful woman who is a nun at the Benedictine Abbey in Worcester and tutor to Ermina Hugonin.
- Josce de Dinan: A middle-aged lord in Ludlow whose allegiance King Stephen strives to maintain, by giving him the castle there, along with lands once belonging to Lacy. He is the overlord for Boterel's manor at Callowleas. He is a real historical person.
- Evrard Boterel: Handsome young landowner in Sheriff Prestcote's writ. He is pursuing Ermina for marriage. He holds manors at Ledwyche and Callowleas.
- Laurence d'Angers: Brother to the late mother of Ermina and Yves Hugonin, a baron of Anjou. He is guardian to both his niece and nephew. He returned from the Holy Land after the attack on Worcester. He is aligned with Empress Maud in the Anarchy.
- Olivier de Bretagne: Squire in the service of Laurence d'Angers for six years. He is of mixed parentage, his late mother a Syrian woman, his father a man at arms in the First Crusade, unknown to him. He is a handsome young man, with black hair and golden eyes, clean shaven in the Norman style. He speaks French more comfortably than English. He is in England for the first time, in his mid twenties. He shows himself to be determined, patient, clear in his goals, and skilled in the arts of war, especially swordplay.
- John Druel: Smallholder of land near Bromfield. He is known to Ermina and kind to the errant noble children before his holding falls victim to the renegades.
- Alain le Gaucher: Illegitimate scion of landowning nobles (the Lacy family) in the Ludlow area. He fought in France before making his fortress in Shropshire. He is the leader of renegade men at arms. He is named thus simply because he is left-handed.

== Themes and setting ==
The theme of the story is family ties, their challenges and surprises in this era of civil war. The Hugonin children's ordinary life events become life-threatening adventures between the siege of Worcester, and the brigands of Shropshire, thieves out for themselves in a lawless era. This novel describes the effect of the period called the Anarchy on ordinary people, even noble children being educated in monasteries and convents.

The Benedictine Abbey in Shrewsbury was and is a real place, as are the surrounding locations, such as the Bromfield Priory near Ludlow. Pershore Abbey, the home location of the novels Brother Elyas, is now an Anglican parish church. Cadfael rides out in the novel to a holding of Wenlock Priory at Godstoke. The village that was the safe place on the hill for the smallholder John Druel is now named Cleeton St Mary. The area of one manor held by the man pursuing Ermina is in the real location of Ledwyche.

Abbot Radulfus and Prior Robert of Shrewsbury Abbey (home of Brother Cadfael) are both based on the real monks of 1139, as was Josce de Dinan of Ludlow Castle.

The siege of Worcester did occur. Noncombatants were subject to considerable violence if the battles erupted near them, or to violence from brigands (or lawless barons) with no battles in the vicinity. This time in English history is described in The Anglo-Saxon Chronicles in this way: "The earth bare no corn, you might as well have tilled the sea, for the land was all ruined by such deeds, and it was said openly that Christ and his saints slept. These things, and more than we can say, did we suffer during nineteen years because of our sins."

== Critical reception ==
Kirkus Reviews liked the novel, saying "Peters' reliable medieval performance as always" but is liking the series less "though the formula is starting to show slight signs of fatigue." Brother Cadfael does "his usual astute detective work" to find the murderers.

Publishers Weekly commented on an audio edition in 1992, and said that "The mystery itself eventually yields to the clamour of civil war, but this historical adventure is bound to please mystery fans and history buffs alike." They found that the narrator, actor Stephen Thorne, "provides a superb narration that intensifies the listener's immersion in Peter's medieval world of chaos and suspense."

The review in AudioFile, an online magazine said that "This chronicle ranks as a favorite in the series." Vanessa Benjamin read the audio cassette version reviewed by Audiofile.

These two reviews accompany the Second Cadfael Omnibus (paperback 10 October 1991), which include The Virgin in the Ice.

- "A more attractive and prepossessing detective would be hard to find." SUNDAY TIMES
- "If this is a first-time read then it will be sheer bad luck if the reader does not fall for Cadfael." THE TIMES

== Publication history ==
Four hardback editions in the US and the UK are listed as published from April 1982 to January 1999. There are eleven paperback editions in English, again published in the UK or the US, from March 1984 to October 2011 (ISBN 0751547174 / 9780751547177, UK edition, Publisher Sphere). Audio books began on cassette in November 1991. A dozen audio editions were released, the latest in July 2012 on compact disk (ISBN 978-1441724793, Publisher Blackstone Audiobooks).

In addition to English language editions, GoodReads lists editions in 13 European languages (French, German, Spanish, Portuguese, Italian, Dutch, Czech, Slovenian, Estonian, Lithuanian, modern Greek, Swedish, Norwegian) and Korean, published from 1990 to 2006.

- Italian: La vergine nel ghiaccio, Published 1993 by TEA Mass Market Paperback, 236 pages, Author(s) Ellis Peters, Elsa Pelitti (Translator) ISBN 9788878193130
- French: La vierge dans la glace (Frère cadfael, #6), Published 7 June 2001 by 10/18, Mass Market Paperback, 300 pages, Author(s): Ellis Peters ISBN 9782264032867
- German: Die Jungfrau im Eis (Bruder Cadfael, #6), Published 1986 by Heyne Deutsche Erstausgabe, Paperback, 252 pages, Author(s) Ellis Peters ISBN 9783453022249
- Dutch: De kille maagd (Chronicles of Brother Cadfael #6) Published 1988 by De Boekerij, Paperback, 218 pages, Author(s) Ellis Peters, Pieter Janssens (Translator) ISBN 9789022508404
- Swedish: Mördande vinter (Broder Cadfael #6), 236 pages Author(s) Ellis Peters
- Portuguese: A Virgem Presa no Gelo (Crime Perfeito, #19), Published 1990 by Publicações Europa-América, Paperback, 220 pages, Author(s) Ellis Peters, Mafalda Ferrari (Translator) ISBN 9721030872

Also, editions in Spanish, Korean, Russian, Czech, Slovenian, Hebrew and two versions in Polish are listed at World Cat, among its 52 listed editions.

- Polish: Dziewica w bryle lodu, by Ellis Peters; Irena Doleżal-Nowicka, 2000 Poznań Zysk i S-ka, ISBN 9788371506550
- Polish: Wyprawa w śniegi, by Ellis Peters; Anna Kacmajor; Magdalena Kacmajor 1993 Gdańsk: Phantom Press International, ISBN 9788370755065
- Spanish: La virgen de hielo, by Ellis Peters 2001 1a. ed. en Mitos Bolsillo Barcelona Grijalbo Mondadori, ISBN 9788422672487
- Korean: 얼음속의처녀 : 엘리스피터스장편소설 /Ŏrŭm sok ŭi ch'ŏnyŏ : Ellisŭ P'it'ŏsŭ changp'yŏn sosŏl by Ellis Peters; In-sŏk Ch'oe 1998 Ch'op'an 북하우스, Sŏul-si Buk Hausŭ, ISBN 9788987871097
- Russian: Pogrebennai︠a︡ vo lʹdakh shestai︠a︡ khronika Brata Kadfaėli︠a︡, by Ellis Peters 1996, Sankt-Peterburg Izd-vo "Azbuka" Izdatelʹskiĭ T︠s︡entr "Terra", ISBN 9785768400132
- Czech: Panna v ledu : případ bratra Cadfaela, by Edith Pargeter; Zora Wolfová, 1996, Vyd. 1 Praha Mladá fronta, ISBN 9788020406125
- Slovenian: Dekle v zrcalu, by Ellis Peters; Andrej Novak, 1989, V Ljubljani, Prešernova družba, OCLC 439026944
- Hebrew: Betulat ha-ḳeraḥ, by Ellis Peters; ʻImanuʼel Loṭem 1993, Tel Aviv: Bitan, OCLC 28765176

Although all the books in the series have been translated to languages other than English, this is the longest list of languages found for one specific novel so far, seventeen.

== Adaptations ==
=== Television ===
The book became the first episode in the second series (and fifth episode overall) in the Cadfael series by Central Television in late 1995.

=== Radio ===
The Virgin in the Ice was adapted in five parts for BBC Radio 4 by Bert Coules in 1993:

1. Casualties of War – News comes to Shrewsbury of two missing noble children, Yves and Ermina Hugonin, but Cadfael's search for them turns up a terrible discovery.
2. Danger From All Sides – Cadfael, Hugh Beringar and Yves' tracing of Ermina's movements also uncovers traces of the outlaws' atrocities and of a mysterious stranger also searching for the Hugonins.
3. Found and Lost – Brother Elyas flees into the night, tormented by unresolved memories, pursued by Yves, while Ermina walks into Bromptom Abbey on her own ... or so it seems.
4. The Wolves' Nest – Cadfael tracks Yves and Brother Elyas to the outlaws' stronghold, uncovering more clues concerning Brother Elyas and Sister Hilaria on the way, but rescuing Yves won't be so easy.
5. Discoveries – The battle to rescue Yves continues, but its conclusion still leaves more mysteries and a murder to solve ... and, for Cadfael personally, a revelation.

This adaptation starred Philip Madoc as Brother Cadfael, Douglas Hodge as Hugh Beringar and Sir Michael Hordern as the Narrator. The serial has since been repeated on BBC Radio 7 and Radio 4 Extra and is available as an audio book.

=== Theatre ===
In 2013, the Middle Ground Theatre Company toured the UK with an adaption featuring Gareth Thomas as Brother Cadfael.
