= A Morbid Taste for Bones =

Book by Ellis Peters

- UK first edition cover
- Author: Ellis Peters
- Series: The Cadfael Chronicles
- Genre: Historical mystery
- Publisher: Macmillan
- Publication date: 1977
- Publication place: United Kingdom
- Media type: Print (Hardcover, Paperback) & audio book
- Pages: 192 (first edition hardback)
- ISBN: 978-0-333-22324-6
- OCLC: 5678687
- Followed by: One Corpse Too Many

A Morbid Taste for Bones is a medieval mystery novel by Ellis Peters set in May 1137. It is the first novel in The Cadfael Chronicles, first published in 1977.

It was adapted for television in 1996 by Central for ITV.

The monks of Shrewsbury Abbey seek the relics of a saint in Wales for their chapel. The locals object to this translation of the relics, and a local leader is found murdered. Brother Cadfael is challenged to uncover the truth of the murder and help bring right endings to all parties, in both Wales and in the Abbey.

This novel was listed on the 1990 list of The Top 100 Crime Novels of All Time by the Crime Writers' Association in the UK, and also on the top 100 list compiled in 1995 by the Mystery Writers of America. In 2010, The Wall Street Journal named it one of their "Five Best Historical Mystery Novels".

== Plot ==
In May 1137, Prior Robert of Shrewsbury Abbey is determined that the Abbey must have the relics of a saint. Finding no suitable local saint, Robert finds one in nearby Wales.

Brother Cadfael has two novices assisting him in his herb and vegetable gardens: John (practical and down-to-earth, whose vocation Cadfael doubts) and the ambitious Columbanus (about whose "falling sickness" illness Cadfael is sceptical, although he treats him with sedating poppy syrup). After one such fit, Brother Jerome, Robert's clerk, claims that a vision of St. Winifred instructed him that Columbanus must go to Saint Winifred's Well in North Wales for a cure. When they return, Columbanus says Saint Winifred appeared to him, saying that her grave at Gwytherin was neglected; she wished to lie somewhere more accessible to pilgrims. Abbot Heribert approves the trip to Wales to retrieve Winifred's remains. Robert, Sub-Prior Richard, Jerome and Columbanus are joined by Cadfael (a Welshman, as interpreter) and John (for menial work).

The bishop of Bangor and Owain Gwynedd (prince of Gwynedd) consent to the Abbey's request. When the monks reach Gwytherin (on the Cledwen River), the local priest, Father Huw, objects to Winifred's remains being removed without approval by the free men of the parish. Rhisiart, the community's most influential landowner, opposes Winifred's removal. Robert tries to bribe him, and Rhisiart storms off. The assembly dissolves, agreeing with Rhisiart. Father Huw persuades Robert to ask Rhisiart for another meeting the next day, to which Rhisiart agrees. While John helps the servants (and Jerome and Columbanus keep vigil at Winifred's chapel), Robert, Richard, Cadfael and Huw await Rhisiart; he does not appear. The landowner is found dead in the woods, with an arrow in his chest bearing the mark of Engelard (an Englishman alltud working for Rhisiart and in love with Rhisiart's daughter Sioned). When Engelard appears, Robert insists he be taken into custody. Engelard flees, and Brother John impedes the only local man close enough to stop him. Robert orders John held for breaking the law of Gwynedd and his vow of obedience; this pleases John as he is held where his new love, Annest, the local blacksmith's niece, lives.

Cadfael realises that Engelard's arrow did not kill Rhisiart: his back is damp from rain-soaked grass and earth, while his front is dry. Cadfael's conclusion: Rhisiart was stabbed from behind by a dagger, falling face-down. After it rained, someone turned him over and pushed an arrow into the wound from the front. The locals see Rhisiart's death as an omen, and agree to Winifred's removal; Robert plans to exhume her remains after a three-night vigil. Cadfael hopes the superstition that a corpse will bleed if touched by the murderer will force a confession, and at his suggestion Sioned asks that after each night's prayer those keeping watch place their hands on Rhisiart's heart. The first night, Jerome and Father Huw keep the vigil. Father Huw readily lays his hand on Rhisiart. Jerome hesitates, but says he will do so if Prior Robert feels it justified. Prior Robert gives him leave. The third night, Cadfael and Columbanus keep watch. Columbanus has another seizure; he is removed unconscious in the morning, evading Sioned's request. He recovers after mass, saying that Winifred told him Rhisiart should be buried in her grave when she is removed.

St. Winifred is exhumed, her linen-wrapped skeleton placed in the reliquary brought from Shrewsbury and the coffin sealed with wax. As Rhisiart is prepared for burial, Sioned asks Peredur (another suitor) to place a jeweled cross on his body. Peredur refuses, confessing that he found Rhisiart dead and pushed Engelard's arrow into the wound so Engelard would disappear as rival for Sioned's hand. Cadfael finds the flask of poppy syrup (brought for Columbanus) nearly empty, recalling that on the night Rhisiart was murdered, only Jerome drank the wine provided for the vigil; if Jerome slept through the vigil, he would be ashamed to admit it. Before the monks depart, Columbanus offers to keep vigil and drowses; a vision of a veiled young woman wakes him, identifying herself as St. Winifred and demanding to know why he murdered Rhisiart. In terror of divine retribution, Columbanus confesses, begging forgiveness. However, the "vision" comes too close, and touching her veil Columbanus realises the saint is a disguised Sioned and slashes at her with a knife before fleeing. Cadfael and Engelard tackle him outside, and Engelard, enraged at Columbanus' wounding of Sioned, accidentally breaks Columbanus' neck. Cadfael acts quickly; he, Engelard and Sioned undress Columbanus, open the reliquary, replace her in the grave above Rhisiart's body and place Columbanus's body in the reliquary, ensuring that the seals on the coffin appear undisturbed.

Columbanus' sandals, shirt and habit are found on the chapel floor, with hawthorn petals around them. Robert proclaims that Columbanus's prayers have been answered; that he has been transported bodily to blessed regions. The villagers (all of whom appear to know or have guessed the truth about what's really inside the reliquary) load the reliquary on a cart. As the monks leave with their "prize", the villagers gather on a hillside to bid them farewell, and Cadfael sees John hiding among them.

Two years later, Bened the Gwytherin blacksmith calls at Shrewsbury, telling Cadfael that John and Annest are married and John will become smith after Bened. Sioned and Engelard, also married, have named their child Cadfael. Bened also notes that Winifred's former resting place is the scene of pilgrimages and cures, while the Abbey reliquary is ignored by pilgrims. Cadfael muses that the saint will not mind sharing her grave with Rhisiart.

== Characters ==
- Brother Cadfael: Herbalist monk at Shrewsbury Abbey. He is 57 years old, a man who came to his vocation in the monastery about 17 years earlier, after his life as man at arms in the First Crusade, sailor, and in service of a Norman lord.
- Prior Robert Pennant: Prior at Shrewsbury Abbey. He is based on the historical prior who did bring the relics to the Abbey. He is characterised as a man of the aristocracy, of mixed Welsh and English blood; with ambition for more than his present position. Aged 50 in this story, with silvering hair, he is a man taller than average. He believes deeply in miracles and the power of the saints, as well as his own rightness.
- Brother Jerome: Prior Robert's clerk. He is rather righteous on his own account, and reliable to the Prior for accurate reporting of Abbey events. Cadfael distrusts and dislikes him for his toadying up to Prior Robert
- Brother Rhys: An older monk in the Abbey, of Welsh birth. He tells the story of Saint Winifred's miracles and her life at Prior Robert's prompting. Rhys is no longer active, too old and frail (possibly well into senility) for much more than the occasional story.
- Abbot Heribert: Head of Shrewsbury Abbey of Saint Peter and Saint Paul. He is a gentle soul, based on the real abbot of that year.
- Richard: Sub-prior at Shrewsbury Abbey. He is one of the party that fetches Saint Winifred's bones from Gwytherin. He is low key and in many ways the opposite of the Prior.
- Brother Columbanus: Young, ambitious monk. He is given to extremes of emotion in display of his spiritual feelings, and is in service under Brother Cadfael in the herbarium. He is the younger son of an aristocratic Norman family, fair haired and strong, age 25, and less than a year since "tonsured", that is, took his vows. While still a monk, he is shown to be a man who puts his ambition over honesty and moral behaviour
- Brother John: Young and strong monk in service under Brother Cadfael. He is of a practical and direct nature, and a good sense of humour. He has curly reddish brown hair. He took his vows less than a year earlier. Brother Cadfael suspects John does not have a true vocation and would do better out in the world; he had joined the monastery when rejected as a suitor by a girl in England (an event about which he tells Annest in English when she could not yet understand English). John falls in love with Annest in Wales, showing Cadfael's perception to be true.
- Owain Gwynedd: Prince of Gwynedd, as his father Gruffudd ap Cynan is in his last months of life. He is the eldest surviving son of Gruffydd, who proves to be a good leader. He was a real historical person.
- Bishop David of Bangor: Built up the church at Bangor. He approved the moving of the saint's bones to rest at the Abbey in Shropshire. He was a real historical person.
- Father Huw: Parish priest at Gwytherin, where Saint Winifred has been buried these hundreds of years. He is hospitable and direct. Rare for the Welsh priests, he is unmarried, celibate.
- Rhisiart: Largest landholder in Gwytherin. He is widowed and living with his only child, a daughter. He can be hot-tempered at times, but is honest and respected by the entire community. He is solidly against the removal of Saint Winifred's remains to Shrewsbury, despite the approval of both Prince and Bishop. Murdered for his opposition.
- Sioned: Daughter and only child of Rhisiart and heir to his properties. She is a beautiful, outspoken and quick-witted young woman; she speaks Welsh and English; she is sought by at least two suitors.
- Engelard: Fair-haired young Cheshire man from the borders of Maelor, who fled to Wales to avoid Earl Ranulf of Chester, who did not like this skilled archer poaching deer from his lands. His father owns a manor, which Engelard will inherit once it is safe to return home. He is skilled in calling ox and dealing with cattle, good skills for Gwytherin. An outlander or alltud in Wales, accepted for the previous two years by Rhisiart to let him make his way in Wales. He is a suitor for Sioned and good friends with her father (despite some clashes over Sioned, all of which ended well on both sides).
- Peredur: Son and only child of Cadwallon. He is a suitor for Sioned. He is handsome but spoiled in always getting what he wants, until he fell in love with Sioned. Rhisiart tried to persuade his daughter to marry her lifelong friend, to no avail. Peredur seeks any means to push the favoured suitor out of Wales, stooping to planting evidence to implicate Engelard in a murder he did not commit.
- Cadwallon: Overlord who owns lands neighbouring those of Rhisiart. He is married to the querulous Dame Branwen, and father of the young man Peredur. He sends for the bailiff when Rhisiart is murdered.
- Cai: Ploughman for Rhisiart. He is the gaoler for John when he is held for aiding Engelard's escape.
- Bened: Blacksmith of Gwytherin. He is widowed, and a man of good repute in the area.
- Annest: Bened's niece, lady's maid and best friend to Sioned. She is of marriageable age. She falls in love with Brother John at first sight, though neither speaks the other's language (although they somehow manage to clearly understand each other instinctively).
- Griffith ap Rhys: Bailiff for Prince Owain in Rhos.

== Links with other works ==
This is the first of a series of twenty books featuring Brother Cadfael, collectively known as the Cadfael Chronicles. The author did not have a series in mind while writing this first book; the strength of the central character became evident as she wrote the second book. All of the characters in the monastery itself (abbot, prior, monks with specific jobs like the precentor or infirmarer) are introduced by name, if not by personality, in this first book of the series.

Saint Winifred and her shrine are mentioned in most of the subsequent books, and Cadfael often prays to her or talks to her in Welsh. For much of the series, Cadfael is only partly sure that he acted correctly when dealing with the saint's relics. He admits his actions in 1141 to his friend, Sheriff Hugh Beringar, in The Pilgrim of Hate, the tenth book in the series. In that book he concludes that his actions are vindicated when he witnesses a miraculous healing at Winifred's shrine in Shrewsbury Abbey. In The Holy Thief, Saint Winifred's coffin is stolen from the Abbey, and Cadfael lives in fear that the coffin will be opened and the deception discovered; he is much relieved when the coffin is eventually returned intact.

== Setting in history ==
The book mixes fictional with real people and events. Abbot Heribert and Prior Robert Pennant were indeed officers of Shrewsbury Abbey in 1137, and Prior Robert wrote a history of the translation of Saint Winifred to the Abbey. He eventually became Abbot of Shrewsbury in 1148. In Cordially Yours, Brother Cadfael, Judith J. Kollmann's article "Brother Cadfael's Vocation" describes the fictional version of Robert Pennant as "proud" and "ambitious".

The history of the Shrewsbury Abbey includes the acquisition of the relics of Saint Winifred in 1138.

The attraction of Saint Winifred's well, even after her bones were moved to the Shrewsbury Abbey, continued for centuries. It is thought that some small relic of Saint Winifred did remain in at her shrine in Gwytherin. There is a recent English translation of Prior Robert Pennant's 12th century article on the life of Saint Winifred, by Ronald Pepin, published in a volume with two other articles on Saint Winifred.

On the strength of Winifred's relics, Shrewsbury Abbey became second as a place of pilgrimage only to the shrine of Saint Thomas Becket in Canterbury Cathedral. The saint's relics remained at the Abbey until its dissolution in 1540 during the reign of Henry VIII. A finger bone found its way to Rome, and was returned to England in 1852. A portion of the Abbey buildings, specifically the church, survived the dissolution of the monasteries and is in use today.

Welsh village society (as in Gwytherin) and the terms of customary service are described. Foreigners (alltudau, or exiles) such as Engelard, with no place in the community guaranteed by family ties, may enter a form of indentured servitude. Unlike villeinage as in England, this may be terminated by the servant dividing his chattels with the master who gave him the opportunity of owning them.

In that century, Wales included several principalities. Gwynedd covered most of the north part of Wales, ruled by Owain Gwynedd, a wise ruler with an eye to keeping the peace with England while enlarging and securing his principality. Bangor is a city on the mainland of Wales along the Menai Strait, dividing the Isle of Anglesey from the mainland, and a bishopric, then under Bishop David, including the places sacred to Saint Winifred. In the first part of the novel, the two monks visited Holywell, where Saint Winifed was said to be beheaded, the well springing up from her blood on the soil. Her own miracle was that her head was placed on her body. She then lived in Gwytherin as a nun.

== Reviews and awards ==
This and one other novel by Ellis Peters were tied for No. 42 in the 1990 list of The Top 100 Crime Novels of All Time by the Crime Writers' Association. (The other novel is The Leper of Saint Giles, the fifth novel in The Cadfael Chronicles (1981).) In the UK this was published as Hatchard's Crime Companion, edited by Susan Moody. This novel is also on the top 100 list compiled in 1995 by the Mystery Writers of America.

Kirkus Reviews, only moderately impressed with the story, observed: "Brother C. traps and dispatches the loony killer (disposing of the body with great wit), matches the daughter up with the right swain, and encourages a restless monk to drop out and enjoy the flesh. Considering the materials, this polished Ellis Peters pleasantry could have been much duller, cuter, and talkier than it is."

The Wall Street Journal named it one of their "Five Best Historical Mystery Novels" in 2010.

== Publication history ==
- 1977, United Kingdom, Macmillan, ISBN 0-333-22324-1 / ISBN 978-0-333-22324-6, 25 August 1977, Hardback
- 1978, USA, William Morrow & Co, ISBN 0-688-03374-1 / ISBN 978-0-688-03374-3, November 1978, Hardback
- 1979, United Kingdom, Littlehampton Book Services Ltd, ISBN 0-417-04420-8 / ISBN 978-0-417-04420-0, August 1979, Paperback
- 1980, United Kingdom, Popular Library, ISBN 0-445-04574-4 / ISBN 978-0-445-04574-3, January 1980, Paperback
- 1981, United Kingdom, Ulversoft Large Print, ISBN 0-7089-0659-1 / ISBN 978-0-7089-0659-0, August 1981, Hardback
- 1984, United Kingdom, Time Warner Paperbacks, ISBN 0-7515-0712-1 / ISBN 978-0-7515-0712-6, May 1984, Paperback
- 1985, United Kingdom, Futura, ISBN 0-449-20700-5 / ISBN 978-0-449-20700-0, 1985, Paperback
- 1991, United Kingdom, Time Warner Paperbacks, ISBN 0-7088-2552-4 / ISBN 978-0-7088-2552-5, September 1991, Paperback
- 1994, USA, Mysterious Press, ISBN 0-446-40015-7 / ISBN 978-0-446-40015-2, January 1994, Paperback
- 1994, United Kingdom, Sphere, ISBN 0-7515-1749-6 / ISBN 978-0-7515-1749-1, May 1994, Paperback
- 1997, USA, Thorndike Press, ISBN 0-7862-1069-9 / ISBN 978-0-7862-1069-5, July 1997, Paperback
- 1997, United Kingdom, Windsor Selections Chivers Press, ISBN 0-7451-5477-8 / ISBN 978-0-7451-5477-0, September 1997, Hardback
- 1998, USA, Chivers Large print, ISBN 0-7451-8773-0 / ISBN 978-0-7451-8773-0, 1 May 1998, Paperback
- 2002, United Kingdom, Oxford University Press, ISBN 0-19-423040-6 / ISBN 978-0-19-423040-7, 14 March 2002, Paperback
- 2010, United Kingdom, Sphere, ISBN 0-7515-4382-9 / ISBN 978-0-7515-4382-7, 1 April 2010, Paperback

There are 14 audio book editions with many readers, including Sir Derek Jacobi. The earliest was released in 1999 on audio cassette. Most recently, an edition for MP3 CD was released in September 2010, and two CD editions and one cassette edition were issued by ISIS Audio Books in September 2011 (cassette: ISBN 1-4450-1628-1 / ISBN 978-1-4450-1628-3; CD ISBN 1-4450-1629-X / ISBN 978-1-4450-1629-0 and ISBN 1-4450-1630-3 / ISBN 978-1-4450-1630-6). It is available as an e-book since 2014.

This book has been translated into many European languages, listed on Goodreads

- French – Trafic de reliques (Chronicles of Brother Cadfael #1), Translator Nicolas Gilles, 2001 ISBN 978-2-264-03284-3)
- Italian – Fratello Cadfael e la bara d'argento [Brother Cadfael and the Silver Coffin] (Chronicles of Brother Cadfael #1) Translator Elsa Pelitti, Mondadori 1981 ISBN 978-88-7819-214-0)
- German – Im Namen der Heiligen (In the Name of the Holy) (Chronicles of Brother Cadfael #1), Heyne 1984 ISBN 978-3-453-02050-4)
- Portuguese – Um Gosto Mórbido por Ossos (Chronicles of Brother Cadfael #1) Publicações Europa-América 1983 ISBN 978-972-1-02269-0
- Polish – Tajemnica świętych relikwii [The Secret Sacred Relics] (Chronicles of Brother Cadfael #1) Translator Irena Doleżal – Nowicka, Zysk i S-ka Wydawnictwo s.c. 1997 ISBN 83-7150-229-X
- Swedish – Ett helgon till varje pris [A Saint at All Costs] (Chronicles of Brother Cadfael #1)

Two further translations are listed on WorldCat and the National Library of Australia.

- Spanish – Un dulce sabor a muerte [A Sweet Taste of Death], Madrid Pàmies 2009. Translator María Antonia Menini. ISBN 978-84-96952-34-8. ISBN 84-96952-34-7
- Russian – Страсти по мощам Strasti po moshcham [Passion for Relics], Sankt-Peterburg : Amfora, 2005 ISBN 5-94278-799-9, ISBN 978-5-94278-799-8 (includes A Morbid Taste for Bones (odin lishnii trup) Also published by Azbuka, 1995.

== Adaptations ==
=== Television ===
A Morbid Taste for Bones was the seventh Cadfael book to be adapted for television, very much out of sequence, by Carlton Media for distribution worldwide. It was first shown in the UK on 26 July 1996. The episode starred Derek Jacobi as Brother Cadfael, Michael Culver as Prior Robert, and Anna Friel as Sioned.

The television episode makes some changes, including secondary characters and proper names. Brother John and Annest are not included, leaving only one set of young lovers for the viewer to follow. The tension between the Welsh villagers and the English monastics is played up considerably, and the acquisition of Saint Winifred is made more dangerous thereby. To that end, the naive and charming Father Huw is recharacterised as the suspicious and rather grubby Father Ianto, who opposes the saint's removal and castigates the monks for haggling over her bones as if she were a bone at a butcher's stall. Bened the smith, while retaining his name, also loses much of his openhearted good nature, being both a suspicious rival of Rhisiart's and a vehement accuser of the monks themselves.

In the climax of the adaptation, Brother Columbanus' confession is drawn out by less supernatural means than in the novel. Instead of being hoodwinked by Sioned in the dark, Columbanus confesses to a fevered figure of his own imagination. He is egged on to this by Cadfael, who pretends to see a figure of light bearing down upon them as they keep their vigil in Saint Winifred's church. Sioned's part is to stay hidden as a witness, but when Columbanus relates with what joy he struck down her father in the saint's name, Sioned loses control and flies at him, with disastrous consequences as Columbanus realises that he has been tricked. Sioned's lover, renamed from Engelard to Godwin, appears to defend Sioned, and Colombanus's accidental death occurs as in the novel. However, Columbanus' own motives are a good deal more ambiguous in the television adaptation. He innocently denies any ambition on his own part to be "the youngest head under a mitre," and his actions appear to stem from religious fervor and criminal insanity, rather than from a cold, calculated pass at fame. Otherwise, the episode remains primarily faithful to the text, with the necessary exception of being well into Abbot Radulfus' tenure at the abbey, instead of introducing the series.

The Cadfael series eventually extended to thirteen episodes, all of which starred Sir Derek Jacobi as the sleuthing monk. The series was filmed mostly in Hungary.

=== Radio ===
A Morbid Taste For Bones was the first of Cadfael stories to be adapted for radio. It was adapted by Alice Rowe and broadcast on BBC Radio 4 on 29 November 1980. Ray Smith starred as Brother Cadfael and Steven Pacey played Brother John.

The book was narrated as an audio book in 1990.

== External sources ==
- A Morbid Taste for Bones at IMDb
- Moody, Susan, ed. (1990). The Hatchards Crime Companion. 100 Top Crime Novels Selected by the Crime Writers' Association. London: Hatchards. ISBN 0-904030-02-4.
- Penzler, Otto; Friedman, Mickey (1995). The Crown Crime Companion. The Top 100 Mystery Novels of All Time Selected by the Mystery Writers of America. New York: Crown Trade Paperbacks. ISBN 0-517-88115-2. "annotated by Otto Penzler and compiled by Mickey Friedman"
- Kollmann, Judith J (1998). "Brother Cadfael's Vocation". Cordially Yours, Brother Cadfael. USA: Bowling Green State University Popular Press. ISBN 0-87972-774-8.
