= The Leper of Saint Giles =

1981 novel by Ellis Peters

- First edition
- Author: Ellis Peters
- Series: The Cadfael Chronicles
- Genre: Mystery novel
- Publisher: Macmillan
- Publication date: 1981
- Media type: Print (Hardcover, Paperback) & audio book
- Pages: 224
- ISBN: 978-0-333-31985-7
- OCLC: 8170356
- Preceded by: Saint Peter's Fair
- Followed by: The Virgin in the Ice

The Leper of Saint Giles is a medieval mystery novel by Ellis Peters, set in October 1139. It is the fifth novel in The Cadfael Chronicles and was first published in 1981.

The book includes a map of the Abbey, the town of Shrewsbury, St. Giles, the winding River Severn and its small local brooks, and places in the environs mentioned in this story and others in the series. It was adapted for television in 1994 by Central for ITV.

Two landed families arrange a marriage between an older baron and a young woman who loves someone else. The groom does not arrive at the altar. It falls to Cadfael to find his murderer, while the main suspect of the sheriff hides in the house for lepers.

This novel was ranked number 42 in the 1990 list of The Top 100 Crime Novels of All Time by the British Crime Writers Association. Citing the public confrontation and the main character's skills at deduction, one reviewer said it was "another Peters delight, featuring vital characters, a beautifully organised puzzle, and history made real". Another reviewer felt that "predictable plotting is amply compensated for by the author's wonderful re-creation of the period".

== Plot summary ==
The story takes place over four days in October 1139. Shrewsbury Abbey is scheduled to host the wedding of Baron Huon de Domville and Lady Iveta de Massard. Brother Cadfael, while restocking medicines at Saint Giles, the abbey's lazar house, sees both bride and bridegroom arrive: Domville is sixty years old, fat, and cruel, as Cadfael sees when the Baron lashes with his riding crop at the lepers begging him for alms. Iveta is barely eighteen, being chaperoned by her legal guardians, her uncle Godfrid Picard and his wife, Agnes.

Iveta is secretly in love with Joscelin Lucy, one of Domville's three squires. Cadfael interrupts an assignation between them in Cadfael's workshop, and tries to cover for them when Agnes bursts in to collect Iveta. Joscelin tells Cadfael that Iveta is being forced to marry against her will: she is the heiress to an enormous honour, and Domville and the Picards have bargained between themselves to divide it after she is married off. Agnes complains to Domville, who dismisses Joscelin from his service, accusing him of theft. Joscelin denies it, but his belongings are searched and the item found (though Cadfael suspects it was planted). Joscelin leaves with the sheriff, but at the bridge he breaks free of his guards and escapes into the River Severn.

Huon tells his nephew Simon (another of his squires) that he will ride, and trots towards Saint Giles. Lazarus, sleeping outdoors, notices him. Joscelin leaves his hiding place, and the patrol pursues him. Lazarus hides him in a haystack, and Joscelin confides his plan to thwart the wedding. Lazarus tells him the baron has not yet returned.

Iveta and the guests gather at the abbey church for the wedding, but Huon does not appear; searchers find him dead far from his lodgings. Cadfael's search of the area shows rope marks on two trees; the baron was pulled from his saddle by a rope across the path, and strangled as he lay stunned. Joscelin Lucy is suspected. Cadfael determines that Huon died shortly after dawn. The strangler wore a ring, which cut into Huon's throat. Picard is convinced that Joscelin is guilty, but Iveta says that he was in prison; when the Picards reveal his escape, she collapses.

The sheriff assembles a search party. The search is fruitless. At Saint Giles, Brother Mark notices a newcomer, a tall man hiding behind a leper's cloak. Brother Oswin notes that the dead man's hat is missing; Cadfael finds it near where he fell, with a rare flower attached. Cadfael is directed to Huon's hunting lodge, where the flower is abundant, and learns that his mistress was Avice of Thornbury.

Joscelin befriends Bran, a young boy at Saint Giles, who obtains vellum on which Joscelin writes a message to Simon arranging a meeting with Iveta. He leaves the message in Simon's horse's mane. Simon slips the message to Iveta. Lazarus asks Joscelin to describe Godfrid Picard.

Iveta obtains a dose of poppy syrup, puts it into Madlen's (her maidservant's) drink and meets Joscelin. The sheriff's men find them at the abbey; Abbot Radulfus again intervenes, questioning Joscelin. Brother Mark appears, wet from trailing Joscelin. At a convent, Cadfael finds Avice of Thornbury, who tells him Huon de Domville left the hunting lodge at dawn. Brother Mark confirms that Joscelin was already at Saint Giles, having watched him all day. Cadfael then finds Godfrid Picard strangled as Huon de Domville was. Agnes turns on Simon Aguilon, accusing him of murdering the baron and Picard. Simon sought Iveta's hand, as de Domville's heir. Picard realised at the coffining ceremony that Simon had removed his ring. Cadfael reports that Simon was entrusted to escort Avice to the hunting lodge, and he alone knew the route. Simon is surrounded, and the ring found. When Cadfael examines Picard's body, he doubts Simon strangled Picard; the killer had missing fingers.

Cadfael accompanies Mark to Saint Giles and talks with Lazarus, recognising him as Guimar de Massard, a hero of the Crusade who was believed dead 40 years earlier. Lazarus says the Fatimid doctors diagnosed and treated his leprosy; he lived as a hermit until learning that his son had died, and he had an orphaned granddaughter Iveta. He decided to return to England to make sure she was being well cared for. However, when he arrived he was outraged to find that not only was Iveta being horribly abused by Agnes and Picard, but they were also planning to force her to marry Domville. Determined to protect his granddaughter, he confronted Picard, disarmed him and strangled him. Cadfael urges Lazarus to reveal himself to Iveta, mentioning another Lazarus who returned from the dead to his family. Lazarus removes his veil, revealing a face ravaged by disease, and claims it would be better for him to remain unknown; assuring Cadfael he is all right and at peace with his fate. With the knowledge that his granddaughter is finally safe and free to marry the man she loves, he leaves Saint Giles and is never seen again.

== Characters ==
- Brother Cadfael: Benedictine monk of Shrewsbury Abbey, born in Wales, now manages the herbarium, preparing medicines and salves for monks and locals, 59 years old. Cadfael's history in the First Crusade appears again in his life as a monk in this novel.
- Brother Mark: Young brother about 18 or 19 years old, very recently assistant to Cadfael, he is now a volunteer at the lazar house. He is well attuned to the needs of those around him, and Cadfael muses that he is destined be a priest. He is good friends with Cadfael. He was introduced in Monk's Hood.
- Brother Oswin: Novice of age 19, newly assigned to help Cadfael. He is very clumsy at the start, but learns even over the four days of the story, and proves observant. He tests Cadfael's patience and teaching skills.
- Abbot Radulfus: Head of the Benedictine Abbey of St Peter and St Paul at Shrewsbury. He is a man of noble birth, with ties to King Stephen. He is a man of great inner strength and exterior calm. With his position as abbot, he is equivalent to a baron like Huon de Domville in the aristocracy. In this story, he and Prior Robert are the only characters who really existed historically. He was introduced at the end of Monk's Hood.
- Prior Robert Pennant: Father prior of the Abbey, of tall and distinguished appearance. He is concerned with status perhaps more than others, stepping in to pay proper attention to the guests for this wedding. He is based on a real historical person, the man who will succeed Abbot Radulfus as abbot.
- Lazarus: A vagabond leper who appears at Saint Giles to be near the relics of St Winifred. His status as leper prevents him from entering the Abbey chapel where they are kept. Much damage was done to him by the disease when it struck; now he lives with the damage. He is 70 years old, tall, strong and quiet. Cadfael recognises him as a hero of the Crusade named Guimar de Massard, believed dead for 40 years since the Battle of Ascalon. He is grandfather to Iveta, and only returned to England to see her. When he learned of Iveta's horrible circumstances and cruel treatment at the hand of her aunt and uncle, he became determined to protect her at all costs. He wishes not to change his reputation, now that he has protected his granddaughter.
- Bran: A young boy of eight, rapidly gaining his strength on the regular meals and medical treatment of Saint Giles. His mother came to Saint Giles to die of her illness. Befriended by Brother Mark, Lazarus, and Joscelin Lucy.
- Huon de Domville, Baron: Wealthy and powerful man nearing 60, widowed, childless, owner of many manors. He is the intended husband of the young Lady Iveta, following arrangements with her aunt and uncle. He is a harsh man, strong among his peers and in the lists for combat, and a womaniser.
- Simon Aguilon: Nephew, age 25, of Huon de Domville and squire to him. He is also the heir to his childless uncle. He is a friend to Iveta de Massard. He is a friend to Joscelin Lucy, and is both charming and ambitious.
- Joscelin Lucy: Son of Sir Alan Lucy and squire to Huon de Domville since age 14. He is 22 years old, tall and strong. He is in love with Iveta. His family has two manors in Herefordshire. He is a young man of strong passions and high standards, who is well trained as the knight he aims to become.
- Guy Fitzjohn: Youngest of the three squires of de Domville.
- Eudo de Domville: Relative of the baron, and canon of Salisbury. He accompanies the wedding party to perform the marriage ceremony. He stays quiet about all the less-than-sterling behaviour of his powerful relative, having hopes of further gains for himself.
- Arnulf: A long-time manservant of Huon de Domville.
- Sir Godfrid Picard: Uncle by marriage to Iveta de Massard. He has been her legal guardian since she was orphaned eight years earlier. He is a grasping man, whose hope of wealth arises from his role as guardian, with little concern for her life. His arrogance and greed prove to be his doom when he is confronted and challenged in the woods by Lazarus. He is unaware that he is facing Iveta's grandfather, the legendary Guimar de Massard, he accepts but is quickly overpowered and strangled by Lazarus as punishment for daring to hurt Iveta.
- Agnes Picard: Wife of Godfrid, sister of the late mother of Iveta de Massard, guardian to her since she was orphaned eight years earlier. Her wealth arises from her position as guardian. She is a harsh and controlling woman.
- Lady Iveta de Massard: 18-year-old girl, wealthy by inheritance of her "honour" of 50 manors in four counties, daughter of Hamon FitzGuimar de Massard, who died when she was ten years old. She is the only granddaughter of a famed knight of the First Crusade. Despite years of harsh treatment by her aunt and uncle, she is kind. She is in love with Joscelin Lucy.
- Madlen: Elderly maid of the Picard household, she is firmly aligned with Agnes and not Iveta.
- Gilbert Prestcote: Sheriff of Shrewsbury and environs, appointed by and aligned with King Stephen. He is honest, active in keeping the peace and law abiding, but does not have the curiosity of a natural detective like Cadfael. He was introduced in One Corpse Too Many.
- Ulgar the wheelwright: Brother of Avice of Thornbury. He told Cadfael how to find her.
- Avice of Thornbury: For over 20 years, secret mistress to Huon de Domville, and the shame of her family for so choosing. Practical and attractive woman of 44, she has no shame for her choices. When her lover is murdered, she seeks a new life in the cell of the Benedictine Convent at Godric's Ford. She is unashamed of her life, direct in her conversation. Cadfael expects her to succeed in convent life. She is a postulant when Cadfael encounters her.

== Reviews ==
The Leper of Saint Giles was tied with another Peters novel, A Morbid Taste for Bones, for No. 42 in the 1990 list of The Top 100 Crime Novels of All Time by the Crime Writers' Association. (In the UK this was published as Hatchard’s Crime Companion, edited by Susan Moody.)

Kirkus Reviews is also positive.

Publishers Weekly reviewed a 1991 audio book of this and the prior novel in the series in one article, liking the historical setting more than the plots.

== Background and setting in history ==
The book explores social conflicts that arose from the aristocratic society and the manorial system in the Middle Ages in England. Family life, including marriage, was structured around the importance of land, and further complicated by men leaving upon their own inspiration for the Crusades, far from England.

The story is set in a real place, Shrewsbury Abbey near the River Severn in the English county of Shropshire, near the Welsh border. The era of the Anarchy is not long after the Norman Conquest of England; most of the nobles are of Norman heritage, slowly intermarrying with the native Saxons. In time, it is set shortly after Empress Matilda returned to England, taking Arundel Castle, where she was besieged and allowed to leave, as she joined her supporters in Bristol.

Brother Cadfael, not of noble birth and that in Wales, joined the First Crusade, and claims that some Saracens were nobler and more righteous than at least some of the crusaders from Europe; this experience of his life led to his open-minded view to "meet every man as you find him". He alludes to the massacre of civilians after the capture of Ascalon and Jerusalem, and the ignoble behaviour of the Crusader leaders Baldwin, Bohemond, and Tancred, "squabbling over their conquests like malicious children." In this era of political anarchy, there was a code of chivalry for the men-at-arms, fighting at home or abroad. Brother Cadfael is loyal to his homelands; after killing the enemy in the First Crusade, he came to a tolerant view of the people in his world, and turned to the healing arts. Travel opened his mind. In his new life, he used knowledge of plants to treat the ill and wounded. In this story, his knowledge of plants, specifically blue creeping gromwell and its rarity around Shrewsbury, led him to the witness who provided crucial information to solve the murder.

The fictional Guimar de Massard had a strong sense of his own honour. He left large lands to his heirs at his death supposed to be from battle, when he had become ill with the feared disfiguring disease. His scheme provided for his heirs and protected his honour, but deprived his granddaughter of a strong protector when her father died. He was alive but absent from his family fearing their reaction to his appearance due to the illness, yet works out a way to protect her anonymously. In him are all the forces of the era: call to the Crusades, chivalry in battle and in love, the manor system, the importance of family, and the powerful connection to Christianity.

Joscelin Lucy is heir to two manors. It was common for a young man in his situation to be sent at the age of thirteen or fourteen as squires in equal or greater noble households, to learn knightly duties before becoming knights themselves. When dismissed by de Domville, Joscelin considers joining the King's army, as rumours grow of impending civil war.

Lazar houses, separate facilities for people with leprosy or other disfiguring diseases, sprang up as the incidence of the disease increased in medieval England in the century after the Norman Conquest. The house at Shrewsbury was one of the earlier ones built; although one source credits King Henry II as its founder, after the time of this story (using admittedly sketchy sources for the list of lazar houses). The church in England made the separation a formal rule in 1175, and the Lateran Council in Rome made it a rule in 1179. Wealth from the land and the many religious houses contributed to the support of the ill. Inmates of a lazar house were bound by many rules: they must not approach any large town; they must use a clapper or their voice to warn the healthy of their "unclean" presence; and most wore heavy cloaks and even face cloths to hide their disfigurements. Even when living at a house like St. Giles, where food and medicine were provided, most had a begging bowl, for the chance charity of passers-by. Leprosy and other disfiguring diseases were frightening, and treatments were few. There are not many precise records, but at the height of the disease, there were not enough houses for all who were ill. They walked along the roads, seeking alms, seeking rest in a lazar house when they could.

These marginalised people in medieval England were viewed differently from how they are today. The germ theory of disease was not known in the 12th century, and the view of the soul and the body as manifestations of each other is quite different from our modern understanding of infectious and treatable diseases. The provision of houses, people and food to care for these sick people arose from the same world view that insisted they be settled outside of towns, especially the larger towns and cities.

Given the explicit social separation, Joscelin Lucy is a daring and clever young man in this story, to use the lazar house as one of his hiding places until his innocence can be established. The noble Guimar de Massard has become one of the marginalised people. In this novel, the lazar house becomes a part of the life of the noble characters of the plot, whereas in most of the books of this series, it is a part only of the lives of the monks and lay helpers at the monastery.

Cadfael's "syrup of poppies" is perhaps an early reintroduction of the medicinal use of poppies to England. He presumably learned its use and effects in the Holy Land, quite possibly from the Saracens. It is useful to Cadfael throughout the series of books, for dulling pain and calming those in distress, and to other characters for stupefying guards, witnesses and rivals.

Cadfael's final conversation with Guimar de Massard alludes to the raising of Lazarus of Bethany from the dead, as recounted in Chapter 11 of the Gospel of John.

Avice of Thornbury, admitted to the Benedictine convent, plays a role in several subsequent novels in the Cadfael series.

== Publication history ==
This book was first released as a hardback book in the UK in August 1981 (ISBN 978-0-333-31985-7 (UK edition) Publisher: Macmillan). The last of seven hardback editions was issued in August 1998 (ISBN 978-0-7540-1137-8 (UK edition) Publisher: Chivers P.).

Fourteen paperback editions have been issued, with many different styles of cover art. The art shown in this article appears on the edition ISBN 978-0-446-40437-2 publisher: Mysterious Press, US, 1 January 1995. Other editions appeared from 1981 to October 2011 in the US and the UK.

Eleven audio editions have been issued, from May 1991 to July 2012, as cassette, CD or MP3 CD versions. Hodder & Stoughton Audio Books issued a version read by Derek Jacobi in September 1996 on cassette (tape format: Audio Cassette ISBN 978-1-85998-570-0 publisher:Hodder Hb).

This book has also been issued in Braille, English, Publisher: London : Royal National Institute for the Blind, 1982. Edition/Format: Braille book : Braille : English OCLC Number: 219848895.

The book is available for download as an audio book.

Editions have been published in several foreign languages.

- Italian: Due delitti per un monaco, Paperback, 198 pages, Published 1 January 1991 by Tea (first published 1981) ISBN 9788878192171
- French: Le lépreux de Saint Gilles (Frère Cadfael, #5), Mass Market Paperback, Published 2001 by 10/18, (first published 1981) ISBN 9782264032850
- German: Bruder Cadfael und der Hochzeitsmord ("Brother Cadfael and the Wedding Murder"), ein mittelalterlicher Kriminalroman; also Der Hochzeitsmord by Ellis Peters, Dirk van Gusteren (translator), paperback, 1st German edition, 252 pages, Published 1987 by Heyne (first published 1981) ISBN 3453003381
- Swedish: Främlingen i Sankt Giles (Broder Cadfael #5), 232 pages

== Television adaptation ==
The book was the third Cadfael book to be adapted for television, as The Leper of St. Giles, by Central and Carlton Media for distribution worldwide, in 1994. It was slightly out of sequence, as two earlier books in the series were filmed as later episodes. It was the third programme in Series I, where it is the fifth novel in the series. The "Cadfael" series eventually extended to thirteen episodes, all of which starred Sir Derek Jacobi as the sleuthing monk. The series was filmed mostly in Hungary.

The adaptation for The Leper of St. Giles stuck fairly closely to the original novel, with one exception of character. Heribert, played by Peter Copley, was abbot (instead of Radulfus as in the novel) as the sequence of the television episodes did not match the sequence of the novels. The part of Joscelin Lucy was played by Jonathan Firth, brother of Colin Firth. Iveta de Massard was played by Tara FitzGerald, Sarah Badel played Avice of Thornbury, Jamie Glover played Simon, Jonathan Hyde played Godfrid Picard, Danny Dyer played Bran and John Bennett played Lazarus.
