= Cadfael =

Fictional character

Brother Cadfael
- Brother Cadfael Chronicles character
- First appearance: A Morbid Taste for Bones
- Last appearance: Brother Cadfael's Penance
- Created by: Ellis Peters
- Portrayed by: Ray Smith (radio); Glyn Houston (radio); Philip Madoc (radio); Derek Jacobi (TV); Gareth Thomas (stage)

In-universe information
- Alias: Cadfael ap Meilyr ap Dafydd.
- Title: Brother
- Occupation: Benedictine Monk
- Children: Olivier de Bretagne
- Religion: Christianity (Roman Catholic)
- Nationality: Welsh

Brother Cadfael is the main fictional character in a series of historical murder mysteries written between 1977 and 1994 by the linguist-scholar Edith Pargeter under the name Ellis Peters. The character of Cadfael himself is a Welsh Benedictine monk living at the Abbey Church of Saint Peter and Saint Paul, in Shrewsbury, western England, in the first half of the 12th century. The stories are set between about 1135 and about 1145, during "The Anarchy", the destructive contest for the crown of England between King Stephen and his cousin Empress Maud.

As a character, Cadfael "combines the curious mind of a scientist/pharmacist with a knight-errant". He entered monastic life in his forties after being both a soldier and a sailor; this worldly experience gives him an array of talents and skills useful in monastic life. He is a skilled observer of human nature, inquisitive by nature, energetic, a talented herbalist (work he learned in the Holy Land), and has an innate, although modern, sense of justice and fair-play. Abbots call upon him as a medical examiner, detective, doctor, and diplomat. His worldly knowledge, although useful, gets him in trouble with the more doctrinaire characters of the series, and the seeming contradiction between the secular and the spiritual worlds forms a central and continuing theme of the stories.

== Name origin and pronunciation ==
Cadfael is a Welsh name derived from the words cad ("battle") and mael ("prince"). Peters wrote that she found the name "Cadfael" only once in the records, given as the baptismal name of Saint Cadog, who later abandoned it. There are differing pronunciations of the name Cadfael; Peters intended the f to be pronounced as an English v and suggested it be pronounced /ˈkædvɛl/ KAD-vel, although normal Welsh pronunciation would be [ˈkadvaɨl] (approximately /ˈkædvaɪl/ KAD-vyle). The name is commonly mispronounced /ˈkædfaɪl/ KAD-fyle in English (including the television series), and Peters once remarked that she should have included a guide for this and other names in the series that have uncommon pronunciations.

== Background ==
Cadfael, the central character of the Cadfael Chronicles, is a Benedictine monk and herbalist at Shrewsbury Abbey, in the English county of Shropshire. Cadfael himself is a Welshman and uses patronymics in the Welsh fashion, naming himself Cadfael ap Meilyr ap Dafydd (Cadfael son of Meilyr son of Dafydd).

He was born in May 1080 into a peasant community in Trefriw, near Conway in Caernarvonshire in north Wales, and had at least one sibling, a younger brother. Rather than wait to inherit the right to till a section of land, he left his home at the age of fourteen as a servant to a wool-trader, and thus became acquainted with Shrewsbury early in life. In 1096, he embarked on the First Crusade to the Holy Land in the force commanded by Robert II, Duke of Normandy. After the victorious end to the Crusade, he lived for several years in Syria and the Holy Land, earning a living as a sailor, before returning to England around 1114 to find that Richildis Vaughan, to whom he had been unofficially engaged, had tired of waiting and had married Eward Gurney, a Shrewsbury craftsman. Cadfael became a man-at-arms (foot soldier) in the campaigns waged by Henry I of England to secure possession of Normandy, and returned again to England in the service of a nobleman, Roger Mauduit, who had Prior Heribert of Shrewsbury Abbey kidnapped in an attempt to foil a lawsuit brought against him by the Abbey. Cadfael freed Heribert and, being released from Mauduit's service, laid aside his arms and proceeded with Heribert to Shrewsbury Abbey.

In The Devil's Novice, Cadfael describes his life:

I have seen death in many shapes, I've been a soldier and a sailor in my time; in the east, in the Crusade, and for ten years after Jerusalem fell. I've seen men killed in battle. Come to that, I've killed men in battle. I never took joy in it, that I can remember, but I never drew back from it either. [...] I was with Robert of Normandy's company and a mongrel lot we were, Britons, Normans, Flemings, Scots, Bretons – name them, they were there! After the city was settled and Baldwin crowned, most of us went home over three or four years, but I had taken to the sea by then, and I stayed. There were pirates ranged those coasts, we always had work to do. [...] I served as a free man-at-arms for a while, and then I was ripe, and it was time. But I had had my way in the world. [Now] I grow herbs and dry them and make remedies for all the ills that visit us. [...] To heal men, after years of injuring them? What could be more fitting? A man does what he must do.

== Secular experience ==
Cadfael became a monk only in middle age and, as a result, is more familiar with the secular world outside the monastery than most of his brother monks. His personality reflects more modern, pragmatic attitudes and progressive ethics than those of his time, which often puts him in conflict with his brethren, particularly with his superior Prior Robert and Robert's clerk Brother Jerome, who disapprove of Cadfael for his casual attitude toward rules and for the privileges that are allowed him by their Abbot. In the stories, Brother Cadfael regularly disobeys the heads of his abbey, acts to bring about his own sense of compassionate justice (sometimes against church or feudal law), and does not condemn relationships outside wedlock. Both Abbot Heribert and his successor Radulfus recognise Cadfael's unusual skills garnered from a long life as soldier, herbalist, sailor, and traveller. As he has "lived half his life in battles", they deploy him as detective, medical examiner, diplomatic envoy (to the Welsh princes), and counsel. Abbot Radulfus, who is himself a shrewd and worldly man, allows Cadfael a certain degree of independence and appreciates that there are circumstances under which the rules of the Order must be bent to serve a greater and more practical good. Though indulgent to a certain degree, his patience with Cadfael is not limitless; he reprimands Cadfael when he feels that his lack of monastic discipline and obedience have been excessive and unwarranted.

== Relationships ==
On his many travels before the chronicles open, Cadfael had relationships with at least three women: Bianca, a Venetian girl; Ariana, a Greek boat girl; and Mariam, a young Syrian widow, with whom he lived for many years in Antioch. Through the course of the stories, it emerges that Mariam had a son by Cadfael, although he only comes to realise by accident that he is a father (The Virgin in the Ice). After Cadfael takes vows, he has a close affection for at least two young women: Sioned, the daughter of a Welsh lord (A Morbid Taste for Bones), and Godith Adeney (One Corpse Too Many). He also enjoys a platonic friendship with the equally worldly Benedictine nun, Sister Magdalen (formerly Avice of Thornbury) of the nunnery close by at Godric's Ford (The Leper of St. Giles, Dead Man's Ransom, The Rose Rent). His former fiancée Richildis, now widowed and remarried, briefly re-appears in his life (Monk's Hood).

Born in Antioch and named Daoud, Cadfael's son never knew his father, but his mother Mariam always described Cadfael (without naming him) in loving terms. Based on this praise, Daoud decides to embrace his father's Christianity rather than his mother's Islamic faith, and takes the name of his godfather at baptism, Olivier de Bretagne. After Mariam dies, Olivier offers his service to a crusading noble, and quickly becomes his favourite squire (The Virgin in the Ice). His master supports the Empress Maud, which places him on the opposing side to Cadfael's friend Hugh Beringar, though they eventually reconcile their differences. Olivier is presented as the gracious knight and paladin: skilled and brave in battle, 'fiercely beautiful', resourceful, resilient, generous and chivalrous; he risks his life to save an enemy who had been keeping him imprisoned in a dungeon (Brother Cadfael's Penance). His name echoes that of the companion of Roland, hero of the great medieval heroic epics. Olivier comes closer than any other character in the series to fulfilling the ideals of the French-Norman culture, "almost more Norman than the Normans", perhaps because he has consciously chosen it. In The Pilgrim of Hate he is described as having "a long, spare wide-browed face, with a fine scimitar of a nose and a subtle bow of a mouth and the fierce, fearless, golden eyes of a hawk. A head capped closely with curving blue-black hair, coiling crisply at the temples and clasping his cheeks like folded wings. So young and yet so formed a face, east and west at home in it, clean shaven like a Norman, olive-skinned like a Syrian, all [Cadfael's] memories of the Holy Land in one human countenance".

Cadfael works closely with his friend Deputy Sheriff (later Sheriff) Hugh Beringar of Maesbury in the north of the shire, often bending the Abbey rule to travel with or visit him. Beringar, introduced in the second novel, One Corpse Too Many (1979), is Cadfael's main ally in the pursuit of justice. Beringar swore loyalty to King Stephen when he came of age. Although initially suspicious, the king soon came to trust Beringar and appointed him Deputy Sheriff, and finally Sheriff of Shropshire. At times, Beringar has to choose between loyalty to the Crown's justice and Cadfael's private view of the injustices of the world. In modern terms, Beringar has the combined role of military governor and police chief.

Cadfael is tolerant and caring towards most of his fellow brothers, but has several particularly close friendships. Brother Mark (Monk's Hood, The Leper of Saint Giles and The Summer of the Danes) worked with Cadfael in the herbarium on joining the abbey. Cadfael describes him: "He was my right hand and a piece of my heart for three years, and knows me better than any man living". Cadfael is also close to Prior Leonard of Bromfield Abbey (The Virgin in the Ice); Brother Paul, the master of the novices and schoolboys; Brother Edmund the infirmarer, who treats the sick and supervises the Abbey infirmary; and Brother Anselm the precentor, who is in charge of music and the order of the worship services. Cadfael regards Brother Oswin, who becomes his assistant, almost as a son, caring for him deeply and revering his innocence.

He also has a special affection for the martyred maiden Saint Winifred who lies at the centre of the first book in the series, A Morbid Taste for Bones, (this novel became first of a series only when the second novel relied on Cadfael as the central character), in which Cadfael takes part in an expedition to Wales to excavate the saint's bones and bring them to the Abbey in England, establishing it as a pilgrimage site of healing relics. Later recalling the event Cadfael says: "It was I who took her from the soil and I who restored her – and still that makes me glad – from the moment I uncovered those slender bones, I felt in mine that they only wished to be left in peace [...] the girl was Welsh, like me". Through the series he petitions her for help and talks with her in Welsh, as a down to earth steward of the common people, more accessible than a remote and mysterious God, a local channel of healing and benediction, and though after being miraculously resurrected she in fact lived to a ripe old age, Cadfael always calls her "The Girl".

== Faith ==
Formal religion necessarily forms a central part of Cadfael's life as a Benedictine monk, and religion provides the basis for his character as well as for the atmosphere and action of the stories. The Rule of St Benedict is the framework of Cadfael's home monastery of St. Peter and St. Paul, just across the river Severn from Shrewsbury. It is noted that in the year 1141, under Abbot Radulfus, 53 brothers, seven novices and six school boys live at the Abbey, not including lay stewards and servants. Their days are structured by the selection of offices they follow; the gathering for prayer at Matins (at midnight) and the following service of Lauds, Prime at 6 am, Vespers at 6 pm and Compline at 8 or 9 pm (depending on the season). The Benedictine order was originally created by Saint Benedict to combine monastic fellowship with physical exertion, mental stimulation and spiritual duties, holding that exercise and physical work would help lead to a healthy soul. It marked a radical departure from earlier orders, establishing a cenobitic community life that was not idealised as austere or penitential. The looser structure, run at the discretion of the abbot, would suit well a man like Cadfael who was in the secular world for forty years before entering the order. It is natural enough that Cadfael, as a world-weary soldier, should seek out that flexibility of this particular order as a conversus.

As the monastery's highly literate herbalist/gardener, holding a rare skill set in demand in both town and abbey, Cadfael is the equivalent of the medieval physician, possessing an independent authority that sets him aside from his fellows. This enables him to travel, building secular relationships and at times challenging powers within the strong feudal hierarchy. It is the "corporeal works of mercy" that engage Cadfael's Christianity, feeding the hungry, clothing the naked, and healing the sick, rather than preaching. He favours a simple, tolerant and forgiving understanding of Christianity, his practice tending to be based on experience of human frailty rather than contemplation of religious texts. When Shrewsbury is visited by an Inquisition-style orthodoxy (The Heretic’s Apprentice) or a harshly punitive version of Christianity (The Raven in the Foregate), the stories end with a reaffirmation of the positive, tolerant faith espoused by Cadfael. In a sense he "creates his own theology" to suit the situation; Pargeter herself agreed that Cadfael is a situational ethicist, basing his actions in any given situation on "the right thing to do" rather than on a strict moral code.

The two abbots that rule during Cadfael's time at the Abbey of St Peter and St Paul, Abbot Heribert (Herbert) (1128–1138) and Abbot Radulfus (Ranulph I or Ralph) (1138–1148), are both real historical figures. The supercilious "abbot in waiting", Prior Robert Pennant (1148–1167) succeeded Radulfus some time after the end of the Cadfael Chronicles. The "anxious sweetness" of the fictional Abbot Heribert is set against the proud and ambitious Prior Robert, who Kollman argues "almost becomes the true villain of the series". Both superiors serve to highlight Abbot Radulfus as the median, the ideal abbot, with whom Cadfael has a deep empathy and understanding. Both Robert and Heribert also serve to show the cloistered and worldly perils, respectively, that Cadfael balances through his "constant war of conscience". Peters shows Cadfael at the heart of healthy, fulfilling monastic life, which may be flawed by its humanity but is well-intentioned. It is Cadfael, the fulcrum, who helps to maintain the health and perspective that overcomes crises of justice that arise from within and without the community. It may be argued that Peters creates him as a version of St Benedict's vision of holy fellowship and service.

== Everyman ==
Cadfael is comfortable with Normans as well as Saxons and works across the ethnic divide. He moves easily among the Welsh and the English, speaking both languages, with freemen and villeins, with rich and poor burghers, with members of the low and high aristocracy, within the tribal and feudal communities, church hierarchies and secular; he talks freely with kings and princes. He travelled extensively in Muslim lands and voices respect for their culture and people. He lived with a Muslim woman and journeyed as a sailor. When a villein addresses him as "Master", Cadfael promptly corrects him: "No man's master, every man's brother, if you will."

He is neutral in political matters, refusing to take sides in the civil war between the Empress Maud and King Stephen for control of England. His abjuration of politics is influenced by his holy vows as a monastic brother, but also comes of having fought and seen destruction by political will during the crusades. Cadfael is on good terms with people on both sides of the English war; his best friend Hugh is a staunch supporter of King Stephen, and his son Olivier is just as much committed to the Empress Maud. Cadfael explains his neutrality by saying "In my measure there's little to choose between two such monarchs, but much to be said for keeping a man's fealty and word." When witnessing a failed peace conference, Cadfael forms the opinion that Maud's half-brother Robert would have made a better monarch than both of them, but for his illegitimate birth (which would not have debarred Robert in Wales, with its law having a different definition of a bastard). However, Cadfael keeps this opinion to himself.

Cadfael has close contacts with the other Welsh people living in Shrewsbury including the boatman Madog, who has an important role in several books. Cadfael likes to speak in Welsh, is exuberant when getting an opportunity to go back into Wales, and feels closer to many Welsh ways of doing things than Anglo-Norman ways: for example, letting all of a man's acknowledged children, whether born in or out of wedlock, share in his inheritance; and recognising degrees of crime, including homicide, which allows leniency to killers in certain circumstances, rather than the inflexibly mandatory capital punishment of Norman Law, administered reluctantly by Hugh Beringar and rigidly by his superior, Sheriff Gilbert Prestcote. Cadfael has, however, voluntarily chosen to join an English monastery rather than a Welsh one, and make his home in England – although close to the borders with Wales – his secular history having made him too cosmopolitan to blend in his own homeland. As a Welshman in England, and in concord with his vows, he remains in the world, yet not of it.

== Legacy ==
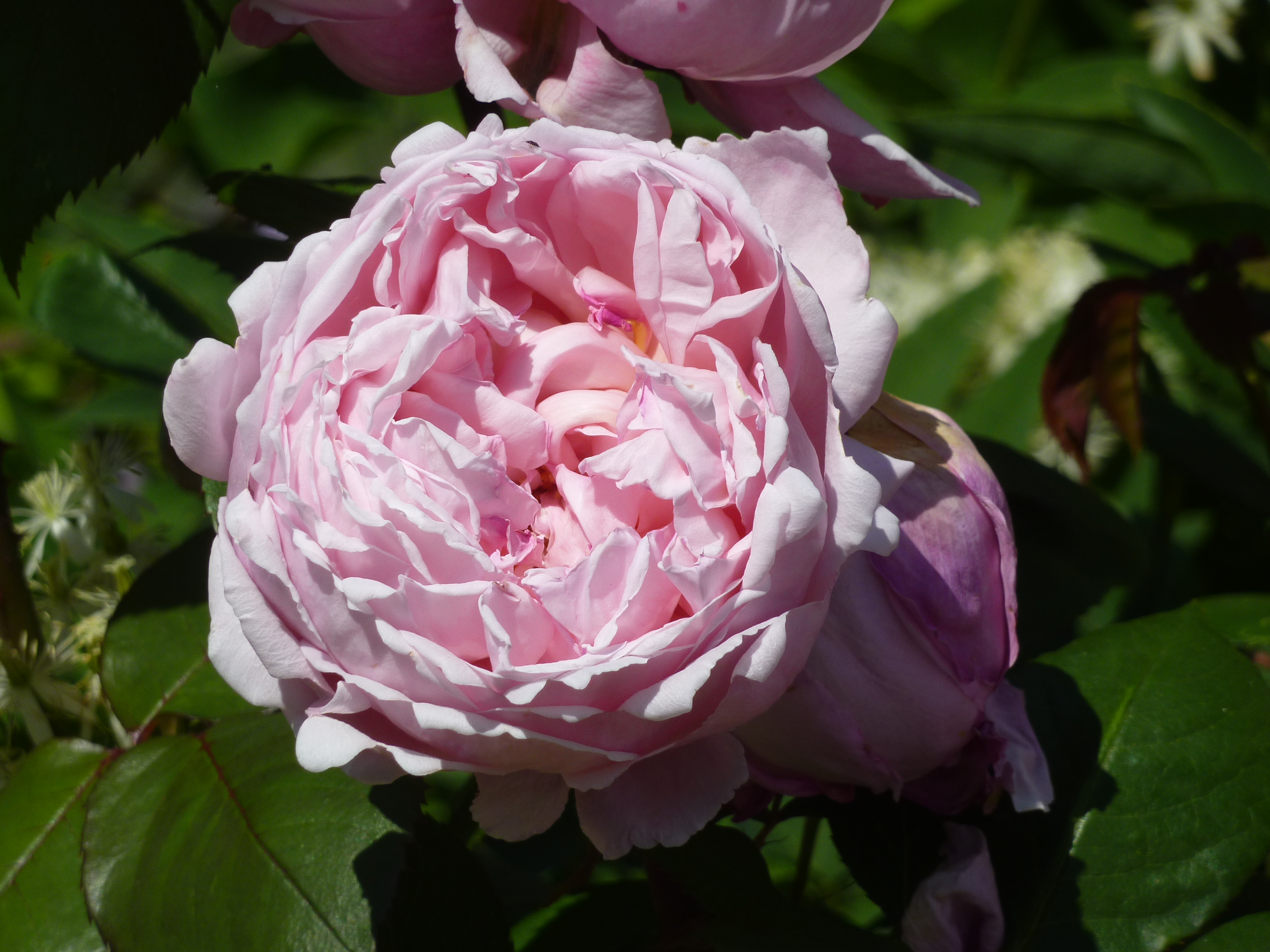
Rosa 'Brother Cadfael'

A rose was cultivated in honour of this character. The Rosa 'Brother Cadfael' is a cultivar by Shropshire rose breeder David C.H. Austin, shown first in 1990. It is an English Old Rose Hybrid, available widely.

Cadfael receives an almost certain mention, albeit unnamed, in Sharon Kay Penman's historical novel When Christ and His Saints Slept, set in the same era as the Cadfael novels, where reference is made to a particular monk at Shrewsbury known for his knowledge of herbs and their medicinal uses.

== Sources ==
- Kaler, Anne K., ed. (1998). Cordially Yours, Brother Cadfael. Bowling Green State University Popular Press. ISBN 0-87972-773-X.
- Talbot, Rob; Whiteman, Robin (1990). Cadfael Country: Shropshire and the Welsh Border. Macdonald. ISBN 0-316-90562-3.
