= One Corpse Too Many =

1979 novel by Ellis Peters

- First edition
- Author: Ellis Peters
- Series: The Cadfael Chronicles
- Genre: Mystery novel
- Publisher: Macmillan
- Publication date: 1979
- Media type: Print (Hardcover, Paperback) & audio book
- Pages: 192 (hardback) map, 254 (paperback edition)
- ISBN: 0-333-27003-7
- OCLC: 655846133
- Preceded by: A Morbid Taste for Bones
- Followed by: Monk's Hood

One Corpse Too Many is a medieval mystery novel set in the summer of 1138 by Ellis Peters. It is the second novel in the Cadfael Chronicles, first published in 1979.

During the Anarchy, King Stephen takes Shrewsbury Castle and hangs all of the surviving defenders. Cadfael, a Benedictine monk of the nearby Shrewsbury Abbey discovers a murdered man hidden amongst the slain. He also has to help a young girl escape the siege, and discover the motives of Hugh Beringar – her betrothed fiancé.

When the novel was first published, the author was remarked for her knowledge of the historical era and ability to create it for the reader, yet "she never lets the meticulously researched place-and-time interfere with the canny puzzle, the flesh-and-blood characterization, or the sharp tension."

It was adapted for television in 1994 by Central for ITV.

== Plot summary ==
In August 1138, King Stephen is besieging rebels now loyal to Empress Matilda in Shrewsbury Castle. Brother Cadfael welcomes the assistance of young Godric, brought to the Abbey by his aunt. Cadfael recognises that Godric is a girl. She is Godith Adeney, daughter of Fulke Adeney, a rebel leader inside the castle. Cadfael agrees to keep her secret, thus beginning 10 adventurous days.

Aline Siward and Hugh Beringar enter King Stephen's camp to pledge their loyalty. The King welcomes Aline Siward even though her absent brother Giles has declared for the Empress. He treats Hugh Beringar with more reserve, as he was betrothed as a child to Godith. To prove his loyalty, he is asked to find Godith and deliver her to the King. Beringar and Adam Courcelle, designated Deputy Sheriff once the castle falls, both fall for Aline on first sight. The castle falls the next morning, but FitzAlan and Adeney escape. Infuriated, King Stephen orders the ninety-four survivors of the turncoat garrison executed that very afternoon. Abbot Heribert of Shrewsbury Abbey offers to give Christian burial to the victims; King Stephen assents.

Counting the bodies, Cadfael finds not ninety-four, but ninety-five – one corpse too many. The extra corpse did not die by hanging, but by strangulation. Aline finds the body of her brother Giles among the ninety-four. Very upset, Courcelle gives Aline her brother's cloak. Later, Godric/Godith identifies the murdered man as Nicholas Faintree, a squire of FitzAlan. Cadfael visits Godith's old nurse, Petronilla Flesher for news. FitzAlan ordered squires Faintree and Torold Blund to slip out of the castle to take his treasury to safety in Wales, then to Normandy. She tells Cadfael that Beringar asked after Godith the day of the hangings, which means Beringar knows of the treasure.

Working in the corn harvest, Godric encounters a wounded man, Torold Blund. He relates how he and Faintree tried to carry FitzAlan's treasure as ordered. Faintree's horse was lamed by a caltrop, planted on the forested track not far from Frankwell. Faintree waited at a forest hut while Blund fetched a fresh horse. When Blund returned he found Faintree dead. Blund was attacked by a stranger, but escaped from him. Blund was blocked by the King's men on every road to Wales. He jumped into the river Severn in a hail of arrows, letting the horses go free. He hid the treasure under the bridge near the castle, hoping the soldiers took him for drowned.

Cadfael retraces Blund's path. In the hut, he finds a yellow topaz meant as decoration to a dagger in the dirt floor. Cadfael sends Godric with food and medicine to Blund, who is much recovered. Blund discovers that she is a girl named Godith. Cadfael joins them. He agrees to help them escape to Wales with the treasure. He and Blund hear footsteps, so stop their conversation. Later, Beringar asks Cadfael where he can conceal his two most valuable mounts before King Stephen raids for supplies. They take the horses to a grange belonging to the Abbey, south of Shrewsbury.

Cadfael sees that Hugh Beringar has a spirit like his own as to the cause of justice and a clever mind for pursuing it. He spends the next day testing his theory that Hugh is following him. Cadfael locates the treasure hidden in the river. He has a bundle matching it in appearance, which he carries to the grange. Once Beringar is away from the river, Godith and Blund fetch the treasure to a safe place.

Sheriff Prestcote begins the raids before Cadfael wakes. Godith wakes early, ensuring her own safety and that of the treasure. Aline tells Cadfael that Godric is safe with her. Blund spends the day on the run. He thinks, correctly, that Beringar saw him, yet did not seize him.

That night, Cadfael, Blund and Godith walk to the grange with the treasure. They hide the treasure in a tree that will be on the road to Wales, then swing back to approach the grange on the usual path. At the grange, Beringar and his men stop them. Beringar means to aid Godith in her escape, as his duty of honour. He wants the "decoy" treasure for the King. Godith and Blund depart for Wales on Beringar's horses, pleased with Cadfael's successful substitution.

At Cadfael's workshop, Beringar finds the saddlebags filled with stones not treasure. He is mystified that they also contain Faintree's old clothes and the jewel from the dagger. Cadfael is thus satisfied Beringar had no part in Faintree's murder. Beringar laughs that Cadfael won the game, keeping the treasure with Godith. The two co-operate now. A beggar tells Cadfael events seen the night before the castle fell: Giles Siward slipped into the siege camp and betrayed FitzAlan's plan to the officer of the watch, Courcelle, in exchange for his life. Courcelle broke the bargain, and also stole the dagger from Giles's corpse. Then Courcelle left the castle, to lay the trap for Faintree and Blund, seeking the treasure for himself. He fought with Blund in the hut. Beringar recalls Aline's mention of the family heirloom dagger lost when Giles was hanged. They conclude the murderer has the rest of the dagger.

Cadfael attends the farewell banquet for the King as servant to the Abbot. He sees a kitchen boy eating his own meal with Giles' missing dagger, fished from the Severn after Courcelle threw it away to avert suspicion. At the banquet, Beringar accuses Courcelle of the murder of Faintree and the theft of the dagger, staking his life. He tosses the yellow topaz on the table. Cadfael gives the dagger to the King, who fits the two together, completing the proof. The boy identifies Courcelle. Courcelle denies all. The King is eager for justice, and impatient to move on. Instead of a trial, this will be settled by trial by combat, à l'outrance.

The lengthy combat between Beringar and Courcelle begins. Aline arrives knowing she loves Hugh Beringar. In close fighting, Courcelle falls on his own dagger blade and dies. With Beringar vindicated by fate, King Stephen appoints him Deputy Sheriff of Shropshire in Courcelle's place. He and Aline are betrothed. Cadfael, now his firm friend, gives him Giles's dagger, which has been restored by craftsmen at the Abbey, for Aline. Cadfael resolves to pray both for Nicholas Faintree, "a clean young man of mind and life", and for Adam Courcelle, "dead in his guilt", because "every untimely death, every man cut down in his vigour and strength without time for repentance and reparation, is one corpse too many."

== Characters ==
- Brother Cadfael: a Benedictine monk at Shrewsbury Abbey since age 40. He is the herbalist after his life as man at arms and sailor in the Middle East.
- Hugh Beringar: a loyal servant to King Stephen,
- Aline Siward: Recently orphaned young woman of rank, daughter of a supporter of King Stephen.
- Giles Siward: Brother of Aline, five years older than her at age 24, who broke with the family to support Empress Maud some time ago. At the start of the story, Aline does not know where her brother is, with fighting in many places.
- Father Elias: The priest of Saint Alkmond's parish in Shrewsbury, where Aline's family has a burial vault.
- King Stephen: King Stephen is a historical figure. He took the castle of Shrewsbury, which had been held by his own deputy William FitzAlan, also a historical figure.
- Gilbert Prestcote: Knight in service to King Stephen,
- Willem Ten Heyt: Captain of the Flemish soldiers serving King Stephen in this battle.
- Abbot Heribert: Head of the Abbey of Saint Peter and Saint Paul from 1127 to 1138.
- Adam Courcelle: Right-hand man and tenant to Gilbert Prestcote, and a supporter of King Stephen in the siege of Shrewsbury, designated to be deputy Sheriff upon victory.
- Godith Adeney: Seventeen-year-old daughter of Fulke Adeney, second in command to William FitzAlan.
- Brother Paul: Abbey monk responsible for teaching the lay students and novices, including Godric.
- Edric Flesher: Chief of the butcher's guild in Shrewsbury, husband to Petronilla late in life, and supporter of Fulke Adeney.
- Petronilla: Now wife of Edric Flesher. Earlier in life, she was nurse to Godith Adeney.
- Torold Blund: Young squire of William FitzAlan, one of two assigned to carry Adeney's fortune out of England and take Adeney's daughter to safety.
- Nicholas Faintree: Young squire of William FitzAlan, usually carried messages further north in the county, well known to the Adeney family.
- Ulf: Distant kin to Torold Blund with a holding near the hut where he and his friend encountered the caltrops on the path.
- Bishop Roger of Salisbury: Justiciar for King Stephen.
- Lame Osbern: Disfigured beggar who sets up at King Stephen's camp.
- Anselm and Louis: Lay brothers who stay at the grange.

== Setting in history ==
The story takes place in Shropshire (also called Salop) in England during The Anarchy, a term referring to the 19-year civil war between King Stephen and the Empress Maud, from 1135 to 1153. Shrewsbury Abbey and its outlying grange, the real town of Shrewsbury and its suburb Frankwell on the road to Wales are the locations for most of the story's action. Wales is a preferred escape route from Shropshire and environs to France in the time of Anarchy, as the prince of Gwynedd, the principality of northern Wales, takes no side in the conflict and is pleased to have the English fighting each other, and not him.

Trial by combat, used at the end to settle the guilt of Courcelle on one count of murder and another of theft not fit for an officer and gentleman, was used in England in the Middle Ages, especially from the time of the Norman conquest to the reign of King Henry II, who introduced a more efficient system of jury trials, but extending to the 16th century. When King Stephen uttered "à l'outrance", he meant the combat had to be to the death of one of the two. The phrase means to the uttermost in some usages, but to the death in this usage.

== Critical reception ==
Kirkus Reviews wrote that the author had improved on the first novel.

Fantastic Fiction's website reprints the following quote: "Each addition to the series is a joy. Long may the chronicles continue." from a review from USA Today.

== Publication history ==
There are seven hardback publications including the first in 1979, and about two dozen paperback editions of this book, in English, published in the UK or the US, listed at Fantastic Fiction. A sample follows:

- 1979, United Kingdom, Macmillan, ISBN 0-333-27003-7 / 978-0-333-27003-5, 19 July 1979, Hardback
- 1980, USA, William Morrow & Co, ISBN 0-688-03630-9 / 978-0-688-03630-0, May 1980, Hardback
- 1982, United Kingdom, Ulverscroft Large Print Books Ltd, ISBN 0-7089-0788-1 / 978-0-7089-0788-7, May 1982, Hardback
- 1985, USA, Little Brown and Co., ISBN 0-07-515021-2 / 978-0-07-515021-3, April 1985, Hardback
- 1995, (USA edition) Little Brown and Co. (UK), ISBN 0-07-515021-2 / 978-0-07-515021-3 April 1995 Hardback
- 1997, (UK edition) Chivers Large print (Chivers, Windsor, Paragon & Co), ISBN 0-7540-1015-5 / 978-0-7540-1015-9, November 1997
- 1980, (UK edition) Littlehampton Book Services Ltd, ISBN 0-417-05230-8 / 978-0-417-05230-4, October 1980 Paperback
- 1994, (USA edition) Grand Central Publishing, ISBN 0-446-40051-3 / 978-0-446-40051-0, March 1994, Paperback
- 2010, (UK edition), Sphere, ISBN 0-7515-4372-1 / 978-0-7515-4372-8 Paperback

Thirteen audio book editions have been issued, beginning in June 1990. The most recent include audio CD edition in September 2010 by Blackstone Audiobooks ISBN 1433264706 / 9781433264702, and in January 2012 an audio cassette edition ISBN 1445016311 / 9781445016313 and two audio CD editions by ISIS Audio Books (ISBN 1445016338 / 9781445016337 and ISBN 144501632X / 9781445016320).

This book has been translated to other languages, with entries in the French and Italian versions of Wikipedia.

== Adaptations ==
=== Television ===
One Corpse Too Many was the first Cadfael book to be adapted for television by Carlton Media for distribution worldwide, in 1994. The Cadfael series eventually extended to thirteen 75-minute episodes, all of which starred Derek Jacobi as the sleuthing monk. It was directed by Graham Theakson, the screenplay was by Russell Lewis, and the cast featured Sean Pertwee as Hugh Beringar, Christian Burgess as Adam Courcelle and Michael Grandage as King Stephen. The series was filmed mostly in Hungary. The adaptation for One Corpse Too Many stuck closely to the original novel, with only minor plot or script deviations to cater for the different medium.

The episode was one of four released in an audio format with linking narration by Acorn Media.

=== Radio ===
The book was also adapted for BBC Radio 4 in 1990, starring Glyn Houston as Brother Cadfael and Geoffrey Whitehead as Adam Courcelle. It has several times been rebroadcast on BBC Radio 7, later on BBC Radio 4 Extra.
