= Listed buildings in Oswestry Rural =

Oswestry Rural is a civil parish in Shropshire, England. It contains 94 listed buildings that are recorded in the National Heritage List for England. Of these, three are at Grade II*, the middle of the three grades, and the others are at Grade II, the lowest grade. The parish is to the southwest, south and southeast of the town of Oswestry. It contains numerous villages and smaller settlements, including Rhydycroesau, Trefonen, Morda, Maesbury, and Treflach, and is otherwise completely rural. Most of the listed buildings are farmhouses, farm buildings, houses and cottages, the earliest of which are timber framed, or which have a timber-framed core. In the parish are three country houses that are listed, together with associated structures in the grounds. The Montgomery Canal passes through the parish and the listed buildings associated with this are three bridges and a crane. The other listed buildings include a holy well, road bridges, a public house, two former mills, two milestones, a former chapel, and three pumps with basins.

== Key ==
Grade	Criteria
II*	Particularly important buildings of more than special interest
II	Buildings of national importance and special interest

== Buildings ==
Name and location	Photograph	Date	Notes	Grade
Barn north of Bryn Pentre Farmhouse; 52.82665°N 3.13334°W	—	14th century	A longhouse, later a barn, it was originally timber framed with cruck construction, it has been rebuilt in limestone, and has a corrugated iron roof. There is one storey and four bays. The windows date from the 20th century, and inside are two true cruck trusses.	II
Oak Tree Cottage; 52.84116°N 2.97894°W	—	14th or 15th century	The cottage was remodelled in the 17th century and altered in the 20th century. It is timber framed with cruck construction, most of it has been rendered, and it has a slate roof. There is one storey and an attic, the windows are 20th-century casements, and there is a gabled porch. At the left gable end is an exposed cruck truss, and there is another cruck truss inside the cottage.	II
Redwith Cottages; 52.81402°N 3.04179°W	—	14th or 15th century	The cottages, later a house, were remodelled in the 19th century and further altered in the 20th century. The house has a basic cruck construction that has been partly concealed by, and partly rebuilt, in rendered brick, and it has a slate roof. There are two storeys, two gabled bays, and flanking lean-tos. The windows date from the 20th century, and inside are two true cruck trusses.	II
Barn northwest of The Fields; 52.82014°N 3.02899°W	—	14th or 15th century	The oldest part of the barn is one bay of an open hall house containing cruck trusses. The rest of the barn dates from the 19th century, and is in limestone and brick with some weatherboarding and a slate roof, hipped to the west.	II
Pentre Isaf; 52.82624°N 3.13220°W	—	15th century	A farmhouse with a range added in the 17th century to give an L-shaped plan. The original range is in stone and has some timber framing with brick infill. The later range is in stone with two storeys and three bays, and has a slate roof. There is a later service range to the west and the rear, and the windows are casements.	II*
St. Winifred's Well; 52.81337°N 3.00699°W		Late 15th century	This consists of a holy well and a cottage that originated as a chapel. The cottage is timber framed with brick infill on a sandstone plinth, and has a slate roof. It has one storey and a T-shaped plan, with a gabled extension over the well. Beyond the extension is a square basin with steps on both sides. The water drains through a hole at the bottom to another square basin flanked by steps, and through another hole into the stream below.	II*
Pentre-Uchaf; 52.82595°N 3.13307°W	—	Early 16th century (probable)	The farmhouse was later remodelled and then extended. The early part is timber framed with red brick infill, the rest is in limestone, and the roof is slated. There is one storey and an attic, to the rear is a short gabled wing, and against the gable end of the main range is a farm building. On the front is a gabled porch, to the left is a casement window, and above that is a gabled eaves dormer.	II
The Pentre Farmhouse; 52.83128°N 3.09307°W	—	16th century (probable)	The farmhouse was extensively remodelled in 1695, and later extended and altered. It is in brick and stone, replacing timber framing, on a stone plinth, and with slate roofs. There are two storeys, and the farmhouse consists of a hall range with a gabled two-storey porch, flanking gabled cross-wings, and a rear lean-to. The windows are casements, there is a datestone in the gable of the porch, and pigeon nesting holes and ledges in the gables of the cross-wings. Inside the farmhouse is an inglenook fireplace.	II
Wootton Castle; 52.84509°N 2.97923°W	—	Late 16th century	A farmhouse, later a private house, with considerable later alterations and extensions. It is partly timber framed, partly in sandstone and brick, largely roughcast, and has slate roofs. Originally there was a hall range of two bays, with a two-bay cross-wing added to the south, and a further bay later added to this. The house has one storey and an attic, the windows are casements, and there are two gabled eaves dormers.	II
Medwell; 52.84509°N 3.12168°W	—	Late 16th to early 17th century (probable)	A farmhouse, later a private house, with a timber framed core encased in limestone, and with a slate roof. It consists of a hall range with one storey and an attic and two bays, and a flush cross-wing with two storeys. The windows are casements, and there is a gabled eaves dormer.	II
Pentre-Cefn; 52.83607°N 3.13757°W	—	Late 16th to early 17th century	A timber framed farmhouse with brick infill, largely rebuilt in limestone, and with a slate roof. There is one storey and an attic, two bays, and a low stone outshut at the rear. In the centre is a gabled brick porch, the windows are three-light casements, and there are two flat-roofed dormers.	II
East Farmhouse; 52.79918°N 3.05200°W		Early 17th century	A timber framed farmhouse with brick and plaster infill, some cladding in red brick, and a slate roof. It has a T-shaped plan, and consists of a two-storey hall range, a gabled cross-wing with two bays, two storeys and an attic, and a rear lean-to. On the front is a gabled porch dated 1677, with a moulded bressumer and a gabled hood. The windows are casements, and many internal features have been retained.	II*
Barn, Upper Sweeney Farm; 52.82442°N 3.06248°W	—	Early to mid 17th century	The barn is timber framed with weatherboarding on a plinth of limestone and conglomerate, and has a corrugated iron roof. It contains two double doors and two eaves hatches.	II
Crickheath Hall; 52.79932°N 3.05478°W	—	Early 17th century (probable)	A farmhouse that was later extended and altered, it is partly timber framed and partly in roughcast brick, and has slate roofs. The house has a U-shaped plan, with extensions at the rear. The hall range has two storeys and the gabled cross-wings also have attics. In the centre of the hall range is a gabled porch, and the windows are sashes.	II
The Hollies; 52.83708°N 3.05947°W	—	Early 17th century	A farmhouse that was later altered and extended, it is timber framed with plaster and brick infill, partly rebuilt in red brick and limestone, extensions in yellow brick and stone, and a slate roof. There are two storeys, a main range of four bays, an extension at right angles on the left, and an outshut at the rear with single-storey extensions behind. The windows are casements.	II
Old Cottage; 52.83020°N 3.07787°W	—	17th century	A timber framed cottage with brick infill, the gable ends in stone, and a slate roof. There is one storey and an attic, and two bays. The cottage contains a fixed window and a gabled eaves dormer.	II
Pentre Cefn Bach; 52.83529°N 3.13935°W	—	17th century	A farmhouse originating as a timber framed building with cruck construction, it was largely replaced in stone in the 18th century, and it has a slate roof. There is a single storey and an attic, with a main block of three bays, a further range to the northwest, and later conservatories. On the later wing is a porch, and there is a dormer on the north slope. Inside the farmhouse is an inglenook fireplace.	II
Ty-Sanley; 52.82686°N 3.05843°W	—	17th century	A farmhouse, later a private house, it has been remodelled, extended and altered. Originally timber framed, it has been mainly replaced by limestone, and it has a slate roof. There is one storey and an attic, it originally had a hall range of 2 1/2 bays and a cross-wing of two bays, and later a range at right angles to the hall was added. The windows are casements, and there is a gabled eaves dormer. Inside is an inglenook fireplace.	II
Upper Sweeney Farmhouse; 52.82433°N 3.06307°W	—	17th century (probable)	The farmhouse was refaced in red brick in the 18th century, encasing or replacing timber framing, the gables are timber framed with plaster infill, and the roof is slated. There are two storeys and an H-shaped plan, consisting of a hall range with two unequal bays, a two-bay cross-wing on the right, and a later gabled projection on the left. At the rear is a full-length stone outshut, and there are two lean-tos to the right of the right gable. In the right angle is a lean-to porch, the windows in the upper floor are casements, and in the ground floor they are sashes with segmental heads.	II
Weston Cotton; 52.84760°N 3.05085°W	—	17th century	A farmhouse that was later extended and altered. The original part is timber framed with infill including brick, the later parts are in red brick, and the roofs are in Welsh slate. There are two storeys and an attic, a main range of two bays, and later ranges to the north, east and south. The original range has a jettied north front with a moulded bressumer. At the rear is a conservatory, and inside the main range is an inglenook fireplace.	II
Outbuilding, Wootton Castle; 52.84495°N 2.97929°W	—	Mid 17th century	The outbuilding to the south of the farmhouse is timber framed with plaster and brick infill and a corrugated iron roof. The right gable end has been rebuilt in red brick. There are two storeys and one framed bay.	II
Pool Cottage; 52.81133°N 3.04906°W	—	Mid to late 17th century	A cottage and attached outbuilding that was estended and remodelled in the 19th century. It is in stone with dressings in red brick, some rebuilding in yellow engineering brick, with a dentilled eaves cornice, and a corrugated iron roof. It has two storeys, four bays, and a single storey extension, and the windows are casements. The doorways and ground floor windows have segmental heads.	II
Gibraltar Inn; 52.81970°N 3.09874°W	—	Late 17th century	A house, at one time an inn, originally with a longhouse plan, it is in limestone, and has a slate roof. There are two storeys, and the house consists of a main range with a short parallel rear range. There are two lean-to porches on the front, and the windows are a mix of sashes, one horizontally-sliding, casements, and one fixed window. Inside is an inglenook fireplace.	II
Manor Farmhouse; 52.80121°N 3.05181°W	—	Late 17th century	The farmhouse, which has been altered and extended, is in red brick, mainly roughcast, with a dentilled eaves cornice, and a slate roof with crow-stepped gables. There are two storeys and attics, and a cruciform plan. On the front are three bays, the middle bay projecting and gabled, and a doorway with a flat hood. The windows are sashes with stone wedge lintels and sills.	II
Middle Cynynion Farmhouse and outbuilding 52.86296°N 3.12520°W	—	Late 17th century (probable)	The farmhouse was extended in the 18th century and remodelled in the 19th century. It is in limestone with a slate roof, and has an L-shaped plan, with the later range at right angles to the rear. There are two storeys, and a gabled extension to the right. The windows are cast iron casements, and all the openings have segmental heads.	II
Plas Pentre-Cefn; 52.83703°N 3.13849°W	—	Late 17th century (probable)	A limestone farmhouse with a slate roof, it consists of a central hall range with two storeys and two bays, and gabled cross-wings with two storeys and attics. There is a gabled staircase projection and flanking lean-tos. In the right angle is a porch with an elliptical arch, and the windows are casements.	II
Treflach Hall; 52.82356°N 3.08283°W	—	c. 1700	A farmhouse with possibly an earlier core, it is in limestone with chamfered angle quoins, a floor band, and a slate roof, half-hipped on the gables. It has an H-shaped plan, and consists of a hall range with two storeys and three bays, and gabled cross-wings with two storeys and attics, and two bays. There is a central flat-roofed porch, and the windows are sashes with segmental heads.	II
Wootton House; 52.84312°N 2.98573°W	—	1700	A farmhouse that was later extended and altered, it is in painted brick with a dentilled floor band and a slate roof. There are two storeys and an attic, originally an L-shaped plan, with a later lean-to in the angle, and a single-storey rear kitchen range. On the front is a gabled porch, above it is a datestone, and the windows are sashes with segmental heads.	II
Barn east of Nant-y-Gollen; 52.85255°N 3.12203°W	—	Late 17th to early 18th century	The barn is timber framed with weatherboarding on a high plinth of stone and brick. The gable ends are in stone, and the barn has a corrugated iron roof. There are four bays, and above the northern bay is a loft.	II
Barn and stables, Pentre'r-gaer-henblas; 52.85520°N 3.11755°W	—	Late 17th to early 18th century	The farm buildings are timber framed, with plank infill on the east side, weatherboarding on the west side, on a limestone plinth. The gable ends are in stone, the south gable is crow-stepped, and the roof is slated. The buildings form an L-shaped plan, and contain various openings.	II
Pentregaer-isaf; 52.84927°N 3.13768°W	—	Late 17th to early 18th century	The farmhouse was extended in the 19th century, and is in limestone with a slate roof. There are two storeys and an L-shaped plan, with a main range, a range at right angles to the left, and a stone outshut at the rear. The windows are casements, some with segmental heads.	II
Gate piers, wall and railings, Sweeney Hall; 52.83240°N 3.05081°W	—	1712	The gate piers and wall are in limestone. The piers at the entrance to the drive have a square section, and each has a moulded plinth and capping, panelled sides and a pointed finial. The low stone wall was partly rebuilt in about 1860, and contains an arched entrance on the north side. On the wall are wrought iron railings.	II
Maesbury Hall and stables 52.81813°N 3.03615°W	—	1714	The farmhouse was largely remodelled in about 1830. It is in red brick on a sandstone plinth, partly rendered, and has a hipped slate roof. There are two storeys and three bays. In the centre is a semicircular Doric portico with a moulded entablature, and above the door is a fanlight. The windows are sashes, and there are two flat-roofed dormers. Attached to the house and set back to the left are stables with three blind windows, and in the angle is a brick lean-to.	II
Llwyn-y-mapsis Farmhouse; 52.83840°N 3.06586°W	—	1726	The farmhouse is in red brick on a stepped plinth, and has a band and a slate roof with a shaped gable. There is one storey and an attic, the openings have segmental heads, there is a flat-roofed trellised porch, and a gabled eaves dormer. Inside are large inglenook fireplaces.	II
Pentre'r-gaer-henblas; 52.85533°N 3.11732°W	—	1732	The farmhouse, which was extended in the 19th century, is in limestone with dressings in red brick, and a slate roof. There are two storeys and a T-shaped plan, with a main range of three unequal bays, and a later rear wing. On the front is a wide gabled porch with a round arch, and a datestone, and the windows are casements with segmental brick heads and surrounds.	II
The Fields and wall 52.81987°N 3.02849°W	—	1737	The farmhouse, which was remodelled in the 19th century is in red brick and has a hipped slate roof. There are two storeys, a three-bay range, and a range at the rear connecting to an older three-bay range at an oblique angle. On the front is a Doric porch and a doorway with a rectangular fanlight, and the windows are sashes. At the rear is a red brick garden wall enclosing an area about 50 metres (160 ft) by 25 metres (82 ft).	II
Domestic chapel, Aston Hall; 52.83783°N 3.00337°W		1742	The north porch was added in 1887, and the chapel is now ruinous. It is in red brick with sandstone dressings, and consists of a nave and chancel in one cell, a north porch, and a west tower. The tower has three stages, angle pilasters, a moulded cornice, a parapet, and urn finials on the corners. Some windows are round-headed and some are circular, and they have Gibbs surrounds.	II
Maesbury House; 52.82451°N 3.03472°W	—	Mid 18th century	The remodelling of an earlier house, it is in brick with a floor band and a slate roof. There are two storeys and three bays. In the centre is a porch, and the windows are sashes with segmental heads.	II
Middleton Farmhouse; 52.85158°N 3.01152°W	—	Mid 18th century	A red brick farmhouse with a slate roof, three storeys and three bays. The central doorway has pilasters and a rectangular fanlight, and the windows are sashes with stone wedge lintels and sills.	II
Farm buildings, Pentre Isaf; 52.82640°N 3.13182°W	—	Mid 18th century (probable)	The farm buildings consist of a barn with an L-shaped plan, a cowhouse, a pigsty range with a hen house above, and a stable with a granary above, approached by external steps. They are mainly in limestone, the east side of the barn is timber framed with weatherboarding, and they have slate roofs. The openings include loading hatches, ventilation slits, and pigeon holes.	II
Barn, Pool Farm; 52.85281°N 3.01260°W	—	Mid 18th century	The barn is in red brick and has a slate roof with crow-step gables. There are two levels, and the barn contains two tiers of ventilation slits and an eaves hatch.	II
Barn east of Sweeney Hall; 52.83178°N 3.04975°W	—	Mid 18th century	The barn is in red brick on a limestone plinth, with a dentilled eaves cornice, shaped gable ends, and a slate roof. It has a wide entrance with a segmental head, buttresses, and two segmental-headed windows.	II
Trefonen Hall; 52.82919°N 3.11588°W	—	Mid 18th century (probable)	The farmhouse was remodelled in the 19th century and further altered in the 20th century. It is in limestone with a slate roof. There are two storeys and an attic, three bays, and a parallel rear range set back to the right. On the front is a gabled trellised porch, and the windows are casements.	II
The Wharfinger's House; 52.81890°N 3.02007°W	—	18th century	The house was remodelled in about 1830. The ground floor is in sandstone, above it is in red brick, and it has a hipped slate roof. There are two storeys and three wide bays, the central bay projecting and five-sided. The windows are sashes with cambered heads, and there are two doorways, one in the projection and the other in the angle between it and the main range, both with rectangular fanlights and hoods on brackets.	II
Woodhill; 52.83152°N 3.08570°W	—	Mid 18th century	A small country house that was extended in about 1900, it is in red brick with a triglyph frieze, a moulded eaves cornice, and hipped slate roofs. It is in two and three storeys with attics, and has an east front of eight bays, a later square projection at the northwest corner, and service ranges at the rear. The entrance has double doors and a moulded entablature on four decorated consoles, and the windows are sashes. In the projection is a hip roofed dormer.	II
Stables, Woodhill; 52.83176°N 3.08555°W	—	Mid 18th century	The stables are to the northeast of the house, they are in red brick with some stone, and have a dentilled eaves cornice and a slate roof. There are two levels, a central bay that has a pediment with a modillioned frieze, and flanking two-bay wings. The building contains stable doors, round-arched casement windows, and a blind roundel. On the roof is a cupola with a lead spire and a weathervane.	II
Pool Farmhouse; 52.85261°N 3.01232°W	—	1752	The farmhouse was extended in the late 19th century. It is in red brick with a dentilled eaves cornice and a slate roof. There are two storeys, three bays, and a later single-storey rear range. The windows are casements with stone lintels and projecting keystones, and the doorway has a bracketed hood.	II
Cottage near Pentre Farmhouse; 52.83169°N 3.09326°W	—	Mid to late 18th century	The cottage is in limestone with patching in brick, the roof at the front is slated, and at the rear it is in corrugated iron. There is one storey and an attic, and two bays. The building contains stable doors, a blocked doorway and a raking eaves dormer.	II
Ha-ha and cemetery, Sweeney Hall; 52.83151°N 3.05107°W	—	Mid to late 18th century	The ha-ha runs to the west and southwest of the hall and has an irregular course. It is in limestone and has a moulded coping. Running from the ha-ha is a low stone wall with ornamental wrought iron railings enclosing an area containing five recumbent grave slabs of Nonconformist people, the legible dates of which are in the 17th century.	II
Wall, Woodhill; 52.83172°N 3.08546°W	—	Mid to late 18th century	A boundary wall attached to the house, it is in red brick and has a stone-capped crenellated parapet and an end pier. The wall is about 30 metres (98 ft) long, and curves slightly to the northeast.	II
Kitchen garden wall, Aston Hall; 52.83816°N 3.00115°W	—	Late 18th century	The wall encloses a rectangular kitchen garden about 110 metres (360 ft) long by 50 metres (160 ft) wide. It is in red brick and has narrow buttresses and slate coping.	II
Urn (north), Aston Hall; 52.83872°N 3.00401°W	—	Late 18th century	The decorative urn is in the garden of the hall. It is in sandstone, and consists of bowl with four lions' heads and drapery at the top, it has a scalloped underside, and a decorative finial.	II
Urn (south), Aston Hall; 52.83868°N 3.00401°W	—	Late 18th century	The decorative urn is in the garden of the hall. It is in sandstone, and consists of bowl with four lions' heads and drapery at the top, it has a scalloped underside, and a decorative finial.	II
Bridge at SJ 3197 2735; 52.83946°N 3.01127°W	—	Late 18th century	The bridge, which was partly rebuilt in the 19th century, carries a road over a stream. It is in red brick with a coped parapet, and consists of three segmental arches. The bridge has a flat string course and square corner pilasters.	II
Nant-y-Gollen; 52.85253°N 3.12250°W	—	Late 18th century	A farmhouse in limestone with a slate roof. There are three storeys, and an L-shaped plan consisting of a main range and a parallel range in the angle at the rear. It has a central entrance with a trellised porch, and the windows are casements, those in the lower two floors with segmental heads.	II
Fowl house and dovecote, Sweeney Hall; 52.83200°N 3.04999°W	—	Late 18th century	The building is in red brick with a corbelled eaves cornice and a pedimented slate roof. The central block has a square plan, and there are lower flanking lean-tos. In the centre is a doorway, there is a segmental-headed doorway in the left lean-to, and in the pediment are nesting holes and ledges.	II
Kitchen garden wall, Sweeney Hall; 52.83137°N 3.04898°W	—	Late 18th century	The wall encloses the kitchen garden, and is in red brick with stone coping. The area enclosed measures about 80 metres (260 ft) by 80 metres (260 ft). The corners are rounded, there are segmental-headed entrances on three sides, and on the north side are heating flues. There is a short spur to the north linking with a building adjoining the barn.	II
Outbuilding and wall, Sweeney Hall; 52.83198°N 3.05025°W	—	Late 18th century	The outbuilding is in red brick with a dentilled eaves cornice and a hipped slate roof. There are two storeys and two bays. In the centre is a doorway, the windows are casements, and to the west is a short brick wall with stone coping.	II
Wall to east of Sweeney Hall; 52.83165°N 3.04998°W	—	Late 18th century	The wall extends from the east wing of the hall to a barn towards the east. It is in red brick with stone coping, and is ramped down at the angles.	II
Sycamors; 52.82669°N 3.06312°W	—	Late 18th century	Originally a squatter's cottage, it is in limestone and sandstone, and has a slate roof with coped verges. There is one storey and an attic, and the building consists of a single cell with a stone lean-to at the left gable end. In the centre is an open gabled porch with brick pillars, and there is a casement window to the left. Above is a gabled eaves dormer.	II
Cowhouse, Upper Sweeney Farm; 52.82463°N 3.06238°W	—	Late 18th century	The cowhouse is in limestone, and has a corrugated iron roof with coped verges on stone kneelers. There are two levels, and the building contains four flat-headed doorways, an eaves hatch, and square nesting holes.	II
Kitchen garden wall, Woodhill; 52.83192°N 3.08702°W	—	Late 18th century	The wall encloses the kitchen garden to the west of the hall. It is in red brick on the inside, and in limestone on the outside.	II
Sundial, Woodhill; 52.83169°N 3.08669°W	—	Late 18th century	The sundial is in the grounds of Woodhill. It is in sandstone and is baluster-shaped with a moulded plinth and capping, on a circular base. On the top is a brass plate and a gnomon.	II
Pedestal tomb, Aston Hall; 52.83771°N 3.00366°W	—	1785	The tomb is in the grounds of the domestic chapel, and is to the memory of members of the Lloyd family. It is in sandstone with a square section, and has a moulded plinth and capping, and a moulded finial.	II
Aston Hall; 52.83862°N 3.00303°W		1789–93	A country house designed by James Wyatt, it is in sandstone with a parapet and a hipped slate roof. There are two storeys and an L-shaped plan, with a front of seven bays. At the corners are pilasters containing round-headed niches and oval medallions with garlands. In the centre is a recessed portico with two giant fluted Ionic columns between fluted Ionic pilasters, and the doorway has a segmental tympanum. The windows are sashes, those in the ground floor are tripartite with segmental heads. The south front has three bays, and at the rear is a re-set Doric porch.	II
Morda Hall; 52.84419°N 3.05816°W	—	1791–92	Originally the wing of a hospital, later converted into a house, it is in red brick with a moulded eaves cornice and a parapet. There are two storeys, and fronts of six and three bays. On the north and south fronts are single-storey round-arched blind arcades, and the windows are casements.	II
Pandy; 52.84874°N 3.10923°W	—	1792	A limestone house with yellow brick window heads and a slate roof. There are three storeys and two bays. The windows are casements, those in the lower two floors with segmental heads, and there is a datestone between the windows in the middle floor.	II
Bridge No. 74 (Corbett's Bridge); 52.83702°N 2.97672°W		c. 1796	This is an accommodation bridge over the Montgomery Canal. It is in red brick, and consists of a single segmental arch. The bridge has a string course, a coped parapet, and corner piers.	II
Bridge No. 79; 52.81828°N 3.01981°W		c. 1796	The bridge carries a road over the Montgomery Canal. It is in red brick, and consists of a single segmental arch. The bridge has a string course, a coped parapet, and corner piers.	II
Bridge No. 80 (Spiggot's Bridge); 52.81764°N 3.02536°W		c. 1796	The bridge carries a road over the Montgomery Canal. It is in red brick, and consists of a single segmental arch. The bridge has a string course, a coped parapet, and corner piers.	II
Navigation Inn and warehouse 52.81846°N 3.01982°W		c. 1796	The public house and warehouse are in red brick, partly rendered, with a pantile roof. There are two ranges at right angles, the public house facing the road, and the warehouse facing the Montgomery Canal. They have two storeys, and a dentilled eaves cornice. The public house has an angled north corner and a porch with a gabled dormer above. The windows are casements, those in the ground floor with segmental heads. The warehouse has casement windows and segmental-headed doorways.	II
Beaconsfield Terrace; 52.84513°N 3.05848°W	—	c. 1800	A terrace of six red brick cottages, with an eaves cornice partly dentilled and partly moulded, and a slate roof. There are two storeys, and each cottage has one bay. The doorways are paired, each cottage but one has a pedimented hood, and most of the windows are sashes.	II
Sweeney Hall; 52.83186°N 3.05054°W		1805	A country house incorporating earlier material, later a hotel, by J. H. Haycock, with a rear wing by S. Pountney Smith in Jacobean style added in about 1860. The house is in sandstone, with an earlier red brick service wing and outbuildings at the rear, a floor band, a moulded eaves parapet, and a hipped slate roof. There are two storeys, and fronts of five and three bays, with giant Tuscan pilasters at the corners and flanking the entrance. The doorway has pilasters and a rectangular fanlight, and the windows are sashes.	II
Bridge at SJ 24113 30772; 52.86907°N 3.12885°W	—	c. 1810–20	The bridge carries the B5480 road over the River Cynlaith, which forms the border between England and Wales. It is in limestone and consists of a single slightly recessed segmental arch. The bridge has voussoirs, a projecting keystone and a coped parapet.	II
Ashgrove; 52.82232°N 3.04471°W	—	Early 19th century	A limestone farmhouse, rendered at the front, with a dentilled eaves cornice and a slate roof. There are two storeys, three bays, a single-storey flat-roofed extension to the right, and a rear gabled extension. The central doorway has a gabled porch, and the windows are sashes, one of them blind.	II
Ball Mill; 52.83183°N 3.03429°W		Early 19th century	The watermill, which was extended later in the century, is in limestone with dressings and the extension in red brick, and a slate roof. There are three storeys and seven bays, the middle bay gabled and with a gabled hoist projection. The windows and doorways have segmental heads. At the rear is a mill race in an iron channel, two wooden overshot wheels with iron spokes, and cog mechanism between.	II
Milestone at N.G.R. SJ 3299 2742; 52.84011°N 2.99684°W	—	Early 19th century	The milestone is on the southwest side of the A5 road. It is in sandstone, and has a recessed cast iron plate inscribed with the distances in miles and furlongs to Holyhead and to "SALOP" (Shrewsbury).	II
Morda Mill; 52.84487°N 3.05867°W	—	Early 19th century	The mill, later disued, is in limestone with a dentilled eaves cornice and a slate roof. There are four storeys and three bays, the middle bay with a pediment. There are four tiers of central loading doors, and the windows are casement windows, all with red brick segmental heads.	II
Morton Bridge; 52.80192°N 3.01971°W		Early 19th century	The bridge carries the B4396 road over the River Morda. It is in sandstone and consists of a single segmental arch. The bridge has voussoirs, a raised keystone, a string course, and rectangular end pilasters with shallow pyramidal finials. The south parapet is coped.	II
Trafalgar House; 52.84262°N 3.10569°W	—	Early 19th century	A farmhouse, later a private house, it is in limestone and has a hipped slate roof. There are two storeys and three bays. The central doorway has a pediment, and the windows are sashes.	II
Treflach Farmhouse; 52.82043°N 3.08097°W	—	Early 19th century	The farmhouse, possibly with an earlier core, is in limestone, and has buttresses and a slate roof. There are two storeys, three bays, and a rear range. Above the central doorway is a flat hood, and the windows are sashes.	II
Milestone at N.G.R. SJ 3155 2791; 52.84440°N 3.01755°W	—	1826–27	The milestone is on the south side of Shrewsbury Road, the former A5 road. It is in limestone, and has a recessed cast iron plate inscribed with the distances in miles and furlongs to Holyhead and to "SALOP" (Shrewsbury).	II
Bridge near Llwyn-y-maen Farmhouse; 52.84697°N 3.08542°W	—	c. 1828	The bridge carries a road over the River Morda. It is in limestone, and consists of a single segmental arch. The bridge has raised keystones and voussoirs, a flat string course and square corner piers.	II
Pen-y-Llan Hall; 52.85022°N 3.07050°W	—	c. 1830–40	A house in the style of an Italianate villa, it is in stuccoed brick on a stone plinth, with bands, wide eaves on corbelled brackets, and a hipped slate roof. There are two storeys and a front of seven bays, the middle three bays projecting under a pediment. The windows are sashes, those in the middle bay with pediments, and above them is a lunette. There is a slightly projecting garden range on the right, and in the angle is a porch that has a segmental arch with a projecting keystone, and a doorway with pilasters and a flat hood on decorative brackets.	II
Former Baptist Chapel, Upper Sweeney; 52.82688°N 3.06366°W	—	c. 1831	The chapel is in limestone with quoins and a slate roof. There is one storey and four bays. The doorway and windows have pointed arches with voussoirs, and overlights with glazing bars in the tympana.	II
Entrance gateway, Aston Hall; 52.84337°N 3.00507°W		1836	The gateway at the entrance to the drive was designed by Edward Haycock. It is in sandstone, and has two giant Greek Doric columns carrying a moulded entablature. The gateway contains delicate ornamental wrought iron gates.	II
Pen-y-Dyffryn Hall; 52.86700°N 3.12662°W	—	c. 1838	A rectory, later extended and used for other purposes, it is in limestone with wide spreading eaves and a hipped slate roof. There are two storeys, a main block with fronts of three and two bays, and two similar rear blocks. The central doorway is in an arched recess and has a fanlight, and the windows are sashes with wedge lintels and stone sills.	II
Lower Sweeney Farmhouse; 52.82129°N 3.06265°W	—	c. 1840 (probable)	The farmhouse is in sandstone with a moulded eaves cornice and a slate roof with coped verges. There are two storeys and an H-shaped plan, consisting of a two-bay hall range and flanking gabled cross-wings. In the left angle is a gabled porch with an elliptical arch and an armorial shield above. The windows are mullioned and transomed with moulded hood moulds, and there is one oriel window.	II
Outbuildings, Aston Hall; 52.83865°N 3.00146°W	—	Mid 19th century	The outbuildings consist of a coach house and former stables. They are in brick with a dentilled eaves cornice and slate roofs. There are two storeys, and two ranges at right angles, forming an L-shaped plan. The openings include double doors, casement windows, and a vehicle entrance, and on the roof of the north range is a reconstructed bell lantern.	II
The Firs and Weston Mill; 52.84110°N 3.04572°W		Mid 19th century	The watermill and mill house are in limestone with yellow brick dressings and slate roofs. The mill has a rectangular plan, four storeys, and four bays. The windows are mullioned and transomed with casements and segmental heads, and there is a weatherboarded hoist projection. At the rear of the adjacent house is an iron undershot wheel. The house has two storeys, four bays, casement windows, and a doorway with pilasters and a rectangular fanlight.	II
Pump and basin, Maesbury House; 52.82434°N 3.03455°W	—	Mid to late 19th century	The pump and basin are to the southeast of the house. The pump is in cast iron and has the maker's emblem on the shaft, a fluted cap with a formerly pointed dome finial, a curved handle, and a decorated spout. The basin is rectangular and in stone.	II
Pump and basin, The Hollies; 52.83700°N 3.05944°W	—	Mid to late 19th century	The pump and basin are to the south of the house. The pump is in cast iron and has the maker's emblem on the shaft, a fluted cap with a pointed dome finial, a curved handle, and a decorated spout. The basin is rectangular and in stone.	II
Pump and basin, Wootton House; 52.84265°N 2.98695°W	—	Mid to late 19th century	The pump and basin are to the southwest of the house. The pump is in cast iron and has the maker's emblem on the shaft, a fluted cap with a pointed dome finial, a curved handle, and a decorated spout. The basin is rectangular and in stone.	II
Canal crane 52.818275°N 3.020227°W		Late 19th to early 20th century	The crane is on the north side of the Montgomery Canal. It consists of a cast iron winch with a wooden shaft.	II
