= Borough of Oswestry =

Former local government area in Shropshire, England

Coordinates: 52.861°N 3.055°W

- Shown within Shropshire
- History
  - Origin: Oswestry Rural District
  - Created: 1 April 1974
  - Abolished: 31 March 2009
  - Succeeded by: Shropshire
- Status: Non-metropolitan district, Borough
- ONS code: 39UD
- Government: Oswestry Borough Council
  - HQ: Oswestry

The Borough of Oswestry was a local government district with borough status in Shropshire, England, from medieval times until its abolition in 2009. Until 1974 it was a municipal borough covering just the town of Oswestry itself. The borough was enlarged in 1974 to also include the surrounding rural area.

Its council was based in Oswestry, the only town and largest settlement in the borough. Villages in the borough included Morda, St Martin's, Whittington, Gobowen, Pant, Trefonen and Ruyton-XI-Towns.

The district and its council were abolished on 1 April 2009 when the new Shropshire unitary authority was established, as part of the 2009 structural changes to local government in England.

== History ==
The town of Oswestry was an ancient borough, governed under the terms of various charters dating back to at least 1398. The borough was reformed to become a municipal borough under the Municipal Corporations Act 1835. By the mid-twentieth century some municipal boroughs were considered too small to efficiently provide all the services expected of them, and so the government introduced the concept of rural boroughs under the Local Government Act 1958. This allowed a small municipal borough to merge with a neighbouring rural district, whilst allowing the former municipal borough to retain some of its privileges, such as the ability to appoint a mayor. In other regards, such rural boroughs were comparable to parish councils. Oswestry became a rural borough on 1 April 1967, becoming part of the surrounding Oswestry Rural District.

On 1 April 1974, under the Local Government Act 1972, the Oswestry Rural District became a non-metropolitan district, and the borough status which had previously only applied to the town of Oswestry itself was transferred to the larger district, allowing the new district council to take the name Oswestry Borough Council.

The borough of Oswestry and its council were abolished as part of the 2009 structural changes to local government in England. Its functions were taken over from 1 April 2009 by Shropshire County Council, which was renamed Shropshire Council at the same time.

== Parishes ==
Map of civil parishes in Oswestry

The borough contained the following civil parishes:

- Kinnerley, Knockin
- Llanyblodwel, Llanymynech and Pant
- Melverley
- Oswestry, Oswestry Rural
- Ruyton-XI-Towns
- Selattyn and Gobowen, St Martin's
- West Felton, Weston Rhyn, Whittington

== Governance ==
=== Political control ===
The first elections to the reconstituted council were held in 1973, initially operating as a shadow authority until the new arrangements came into effect on 1 April 1974. Political control of the council from 1974 until its abolition in 2009 was as follows:

| Party in control | Years |
|---|---|
| Independent | 1974–1987 |
| No overall control | 1987–1991 |
| Independent | 1991–2003 |
| No overall control | 2003–2007 |
| Conservative | 2007–2009 |

=== Leadership ===
The last leader of the council was David Lloyd, a Conservative.

| Councillor | Party | From | To |
|---|---|---|---|
| David Lloyd | Conservative | pre-2006 | 31 Mar 2009 |

=== Premises ===
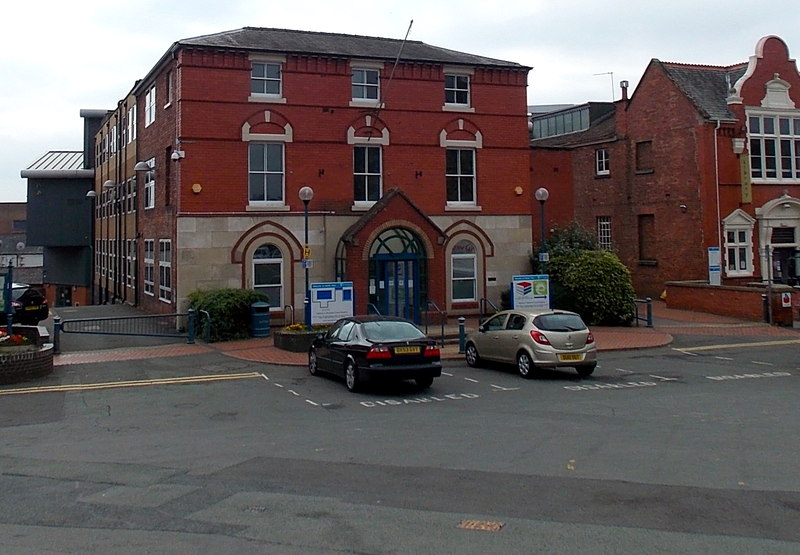
Castle View: Council's headquarters

The council was based at Castle View on Arthur Street in the centre of Oswestry, a converted Victorian house which had served as the headquarters of the council's predecessor, Oswestry Rural District Council, since 1927. On the Oswestry Borough Council's abolition in 2009, the building passed to Shropshire Council, which retains some offices there.

== Council elections ==
- 1973 Oswestry Borough Council election
- 1976 Oswestry Borough Council election (New ward boundaries)
- 1979 Oswestry Borough Council election
- 1983 Oswestry Borough Council election
- 1987 Oswestry Borough Council election
- 1991 Oswestry Borough Council election
- 1995 Oswestry Borough Council election
- 1999 Oswestry Borough Council election
- 2003 Oswestry Borough Council election (New ward boundaries)
- 2007 Oswestry Borough Council election

=== Results maps ===
2003 results map

2007 results map

=== By-election results ===
Llanyblodwel By-Election 1 June 2000
| Party | Candidate | Votes | % | ±% |
|---|---|---|---|---|
| Independent | | 122 | 43.0 | |
| Liberal Democrats | | 90 | 31.7 | |
| Conservative | | 72 | 25.4 | |
| Majority | | 32 | 11.3 | |
| Turnout | | 284 | 46.0 | |
| Independent hold | | Swing | | |

Victoria By-Election 28 June 2001
| Party | Candidate | Votes | % | ±% |
|---|---|---|---|---|
| Conservative | | 291 | 44.2 | |
| Liberal Democrats | | 266 | 40.4 | |
| Independent | | 101 | 15.3 | |
| Majority | | 25 | 3.8 | |
| Turnout | | 658 | | |
| Conservative gain from Independent | | Swing | | |

Gatacre By-Election 6 September 2001
| Party | Candidate | Votes | % | ±% |
|---|---|---|---|---|
| Liberal Democrats | | 327 | 53.7 | +21.5 |
| Conservative | | 158 | 25.9 | +25.9 |
| Labour | | 77 | 12.6 | −12.7 |
| Independent | | 33 | 5.4 | +5.4 |
| Independent | | 14 | 2.3 | +2.3 |
| Majority | | 169 | 27.8 | |
| Turnout | | 609 | 26.4 | |
| Liberal Democrats gain from Labour | | Swing | | |

Cambrian By-Election 10 June 2004
| Party | Candidate | Votes | % | ±% |
|---|---|---|---|---|
| Liberal Democrats | Simon Edwards | 341 | 42.8 | +20.0 |
| Independent | | 281 | 35.3 | −1.1 |
| Conservative | | 174 | 21.9 | −18.9 |
| Majority | | 60 | 7.5 | |
| Turnout | | 796 | 39.0 | |
| Liberal Democrats gain from Conservative | | Swing | | |

Royton & West Felton 29 September 2005
| Party | Candidate | Votes | % | ±% |
|---|---|---|---|---|
| Conservative | | unopposed | | |
| Conservative hold | | Swing | | |

Castle By-Election 3 November 2005
| Party | Candidate | Votes | % | ±% |
|---|---|---|---|---|
| Conservative | Frances Burman | 255 | 55.3 | +9.9 |
| Liberal Democrats | Elaine Channon | 206 | 44.7 | +7.0 |
| Majority | | 49 | 10.6 | |
| Turnout | | 461 | 23.2 | |
| Conservative gain from Liberal Democrats | | Swing | | |

Sweeney Trefonen By-Election 3 November 2005
| Party | Candidate | Votes | % | ±% |
|---|---|---|---|---|
| Conservative | Joyce Barrow | 314 | 71.0 | +32.0 |
| Liberal Democrats | Romer Hoseason | 128 | 29.0 | +15.6 |
| Majority | | 186 | 42.0 | |
| Turnout | | 442 | 14.5 | |
| Conservative hold | | Swing | | |

Whittington By-Election 30 November 2006
| Party | Candidate | Votes | % | ±% |
|---|---|---|---|---|
| Conservative | | 314 | 57.2 | +57.2 |
| Labour | | 121 | 22.0 | −4.1 |
| Liberal Democrats | | 114 | 20.7 | +20.7 |
| Majority | | 193 | 35.2 | |
| Turnout | | 549 | 30.8 | |
| Conservative gain from Independent | | Swing | | |

Llanyblodwell and Pant By-Election 21 June 2007
| Party | Candidate | Votes | % | ±% |
|---|---|---|---|---|
| Conservative | | 254 | 73.6 | +41.9 |
| Independent | | 91 | 19.8 | |
| Independent | | 81 | 17.6 | |
| Independent | | 34 | 7.4 | |
| Majority | | 163 | | |
| Turnout | | 460 | 24.0 | |
| Conservative gain from Independent | | Swing | | |

Sweeney and Trefonen By-Election 1 May 2008
| Party | Candidate | Votes | % | ±% |
|---|---|---|---|---|
| Conservative | | 684 | 54.9 | −14.8 |
| Liberal Democrats | | 562 | 45.1 | +14.8 |
| Majority | | 122 | 9.8 | |
| Turnout | | 1,246 | 40.4 | |
| Conservative hold | | Swing | | |

Castle By-Election 2 October 2008
| Party | Candidate | Votes | % | ±% |
|---|---|---|---|---|
| Liberal Democrats | Romer Hoseason | 198 | 38.7 | +0.3 |
| Conservative | Phil May | 174 | 34.1 | −27.5 |
| Independent | Alan Davies | 139 | 27.2 | +27.2 |
| Majority | | 59 | 4.6 | |
| Turnout | | 511 | 22.2 | |
| Liberal Democrats gain from Conservative | | Swing | | |
