= Llawnt =

Coordinates: 52.870°N 3.116°W

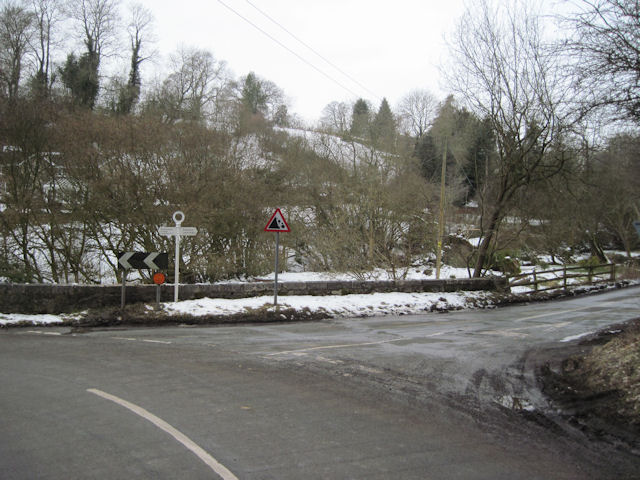
- Road junction at bridge, Llawnt

- Location within Shropshire
- OS grid reference: SJ248308
- Civil parish: Oswestry Rural; Selattyn and Gobowen
- Unitary authority: Shropshire
- Ceremonial county: Shropshire
- Region: West Midlands
- Country: England
- Sovereign state: United Kingdom
- Post town: OSWESTRY
- Postcode district: SY10
- Dialling code: 01691
- Police: West Mercia
- Fire: Shropshire
- Ambulance: West Midlands
- UK Parliament: North Shropshire

Llawnt is a village in Shropshire, England. The name comes from Middle Welsh, borrowing from the English 'lawn'. The meaning in this case is 'green' (named after a piece of green land in the centre of the village).

The village is located about a mile from the border between Shropshire and Powys, near Rhydycroesau, and approximately 5 miles (8.0 km) west of Oswestry. Its location and its Welsh name shows that this was at one time part of Powys. This changed with the 16th-century Acts of Union, when the Lordship of Oswestry was given to Shropshire.

The River Morda flows past the village.
