= Llanymynech =

Village straddling the England-Wales border

Coordinates: 52.781°N 3.089°W

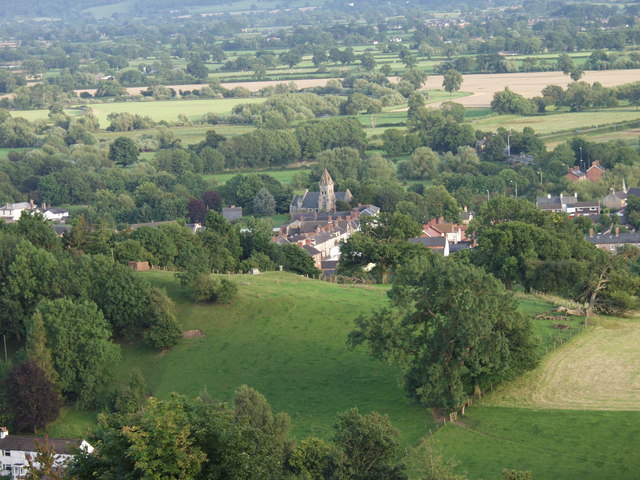
- Llanymynech viewed from nearby Llanymynech Hill

- Location within Shropshire
- Population: 1,675 (2011 census)
- OS grid reference: SJ266209
- Civil parish: Llanymynech and Pant
- Unitary authority: Shropshire
- Ceremonial county: Shropshire
- Region: West Midlands
- Country: England
- Sovereign state: United Kingdom
- Post town: Llanymynech
- Postcode district: SY22 6
- Dialling code: 01691
- Police: West Mercia
- Fire: Shropshire
- Ambulance: West Midlands
- UK Parliament: North Shropshire

Llanymynech
- Location within Powys
- OS grid reference: SJ266209
- Community: Carreghofa
- Principal area: Powys
- Preserved county: Powys
- Country: Wales
- Sovereign state: United Kingdom
- Police: Dyfed-Powys
- Fire: Mid and West Wales
- Ambulance: Welsh
- UK Parliament: Montgomeryshire and Glyndŵr
- Senedd Cymru – Welsh Parliament: Gwynedd Maldwyn

Llanymynech is a village and former civil parish straddling the border between Powys, Wales, and Shropshire, England, about 9 miles (14 km) north of the Welsh town of Welshpool. The name is Welsh for "Llan of the Monks". The village is on the banks of the River Vyrnwy, and the Montgomery Canal passes through it.

The border runs for the most part along the frontages of the buildings on the east (English) side of the village's main street, with the eastern half of the village in England and the western half in Wales. The Church of England parish church of St Agatha lies just in England, although the entire village lies in the same ecclesiastical parish. The border also passed right through the now closed Lion pub, which had two bars in Shropshire and one in Montgomeryshire. At one time Welsh counties were referred to as "wet" or "dry" depending on whether people could drink in pubs on Sundays. When Montgomeryshire was dry it was legal to drink on Sundays in the two English bars of the Lion but not the Welsh bar. Two of the remaining open pubs in the village are entirely in England and the third is entirely in Wales.

Just to the north of the village is Pant. Further north is the English market town of Oswestry. The civil parish of Llanymynech and Pant had a population of 1,675 as of the 2011 census.

== History ==
Llanymynech Hill is one of Wales' earliest mining sites. Evidence suggests that copper was mined and smelted here in the late Bronze Age, and that the metal was used to make bronze weapons and other implements. The hill above Llanymynech is crowned with an extensive Iron Age hillfort, which extends over 57 hectares (140 acres), and surrounds a cave opening known as the Ogof. The size of this hillfort is probably explained by the presence of the copper mines. The hillfort would have served as protection for the mine, and housed the labourers employed in the extraction of copper.

The Bronze Age British miners would have used fire-setting mining techniques, but with the arrival of the Romans the cavern was extended and more extensively mined. According to the Clwyd-Powys Archaeological Trust, before the hill was landscaped for the current golf course, at least ten shafts were visible on the southern part of the hill, together with a large number of shallow pits and shaft-mounds. The main entrance to the mine is still the Ogof. A number of Roman artefacts have been found in the mine including a number of bones and burials, and a hoard of 30 first and second century silver coins of Roman currency found in 1965 by some schoolboys, now conserved at the National Museum of Wales. The mine was probably abandoned c. 200 AD.

In Anglo-Saxon times, Offa's Dyke was built c. 430 and 652, through what is probably the main street in Llanymynech, on the east side of the road. It is thought the west wall of St Agatha's churchyard was built on the raised part of the dyke. Today, the Offa's Dyke Path passes through the village.

Under the Normans, the village came under the rule of a Marcher Lord (a Lord of the March or border counties), and a fortification called Carreghofa Castle was built by the Earl of Shrewsbury around 1101. The place where the castle was probably built, at Tanat Camp, just to the west of Llanymynech Hill and overlooking the Tanat valley, implies it was defending the hill which was being mined for copper and lead, as well as silver. Being situated in the borderlands, the castle changed hands between the English and Welsh numerous times during the 12th and 13th centuries. In 1187 the castle was captured by Owain Fychan, prince of Powys, who was then murdered at the castle by his cousins Gwenwynwyn and Cadwallon.

In 1194, the castle was recaptured by the English with the intention of reopening the mines on Llanymynech Hill and extracting silver. Richard I had been captured and held for a ransom of £100,000, and the Bishop of Salisbury, Hubert Walter, heard of the discovery of silver at the Carreghofa Mine on Llanymynech Hill; he decided to develop the mine and reopen the mint at Shrewsbury to refine the silver and make it into coins. However the total amount of silver produced only came to the value of £20, 11 shillings and 11 pence. This mine was located north of the present quarry, and just south of the present golf course clubhouse. In the 1230s, the castle was destroyed and the stones were eventually removed and used to construct nearby Carreghofa Hall. Very little remains of the castle today.

=== Recent times ===
The Welsh Church Act 1914 disestablished the Church in Wales from the Church of England. During the period while the enactment was delayed by the Suspensory Act 1914, and even though the parish church is situated on the English side of the border, because the ecclesiastical parish straddled the border, Llanymynech was one of the nineteen border parishes that were balloted by the Welsh Church Commissioners to decide whether it should remain with the Church of England or join the disestablished Church in Wales. The parishioners of Llanymynech voted in 1915 by 315 to 130 to remain part of the Church of England. The parish therefore ceased to be part of the Welsh Diocese of St Asaph, and was transferred to the Diocese of Lichfield, so remaining part of the Church of England.

The two halves of Llanymynech were subject to different restrictions during the COVID-19 pandemic, as Wales and England set different legal restrictions on travel and business.

== Governance ==
The English–Welsh border runs through the village, approximately following the A483 through the village. Therefore, Llanymynech is served by both an English and a Welsh service for everything. Dyfed-Powys Police cover the Welsh side of the village, West Mercia Police cover the English side; Powys County Council are responsible for waste collection, recycling, and other council services on the Welsh side, Shropshire Council on the English side, and so on.

The English part of the village is in the civil parish of Llanymynech and Pant, and in the electoral ward of Llanymynech in Shropshire. This ward had a population at the 2011 census of 3,988. The 2011 census output area covering the English part of the village has a population of 477.

The Welsh part of the village is in the community of Carreghofa in Powys. The 2011 census output area covering the Welsh part of the village has a population of 323 of whom 29% could speak, read and write Welsh.

In 1961 the parish of Llanymynech had a population of 763. On 1 April 1967 the parish was abolished to form "Llanymynech and Pant".

== Features ==
Llanymynech Hill is now the site of Llanymynech Golf Club perched on top of the cliffs, whose 18-hole course is the only one in Europe to straddle a country border, being partly in England and partly in Wales.

The village is home to one of only three remaining Hoffmann kilns in the British Isles, and the only one with a chimney. The kiln at Llanymynech was used for lime burning. The area around the kiln is designated as the Llanymynech Heritage Area.

The former limestone quarry which fed the kiln is now the Shropshire Wildlife Trust's Llanymynech Rocks Nature Reserve, and its cliff face is popular with rock climbers.

== Transport ==
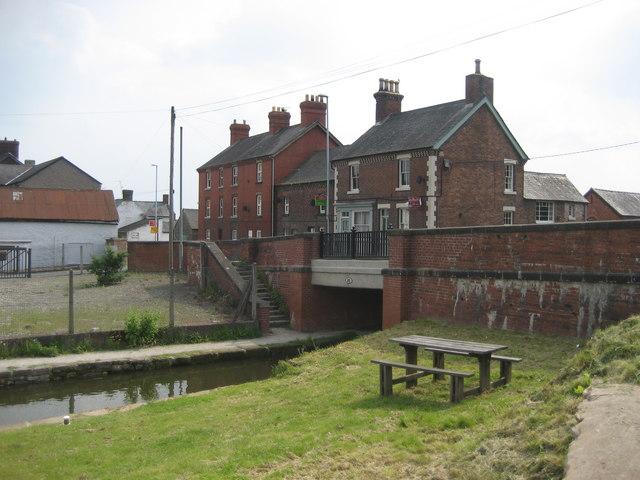
The Montgomery Canal passing through Llanymynech

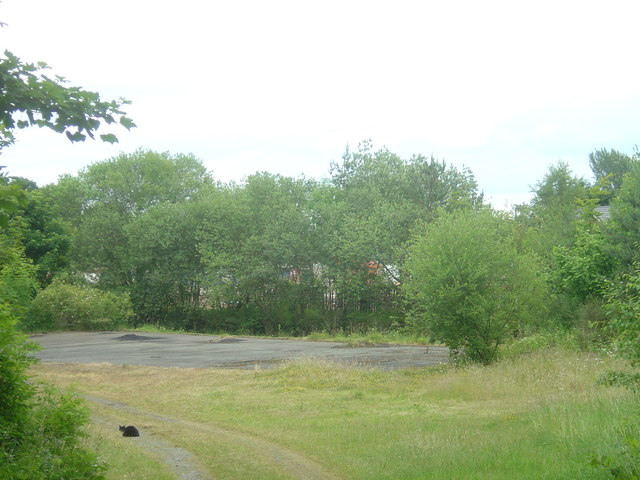
The former goods yard of Llanymynech

Due to the local limestone and mineral deposits, Llanymynech became a transport hub.

First to arrive was a branch of the Ellesmere Canal, where it joined the eastern section of the Montgomeryshire Canal at Carreghofa. Today the canal is known as the Montgomery Canal, and the section through Llanymynech is isolated, with an 800 metres (2,600 ft) section being navigable to boats. To the north to Pant the canal is dry; to the south the canal is isolated by lowered bridges.

The main line of the Oswestry and Newtown Railway (O&NR) arrived from the south in 1860, a later constituent part of the Cambrian Railways (CR). In 1863, the Cambrian completed the construction of the Llanfyllin branch, a railway constructed to enable distribution of minerals in competition with the canal. Stipulated in the authorising act of parliament to avoid flat crossing of the existing canal and Tanat Valley Light Railway (TVLR), bridges had to be constructed to enable operations.

The later Potteries, Shrewsbury and North Wales Railway (Potts), which ran to Shrewsbury Abbey, originally ran under the O&NR and the canal to enable the Nantmawr branch for similar mineral extraction purposes. However, after it ran into financial difficulties, the CR took over the Nantmawr branch, agreeing to rebuild the southern end of the Potts so that it now formed a junction through Llanymynech.

After failing to create a junction with the GWR and the LNWR at Shrewsbury, the Shrewsbury and North Wales Railway suffered from low traffic and continual financial difficulties, having now also lost its main revenue stream from the Nantmawr branch. Taken over by the GWR under the Railways Act 1921, it was again closed to passengers on 6 November 1933, but remained open as a military freight route until 1960.

The Cambrian Railways mainline from Whitchurch to Welshpool (Buttington Junction), via Ellesmere, Whittington, Oswestry and Llanymynech, closed on 18 January 1965 in favour of the more viable Shrewsbury and Hereford Railway route. This also resulted in the closure of the Llanfyllin branch. The Nantmawr branch remained in operation until the 1998, with the track from Oswestry still in place today.

Although no railway now serves Llanymynech, both the Cambrian Heritage Railways and the enthusiast-revived TVLR plan to reconnect Llanymynech with their heritage railway schemes.

The A483 trunk road is the main road through the centre of Llanymynech. A bypass was announced in the 2020 budget.

Since Wales reduced most of its built-up area speed limits in September 2023, the Welsh side of the village including the A483 has been subject to a 20 mph speed limit. However, the English side of the village still remains subject to a 30 mph speed limit.

== Notable people ==
- John Evans (1756 in Llwyn-y-groes – 1846) a surgeon and cartographer.
- Richard Roberts (1789–1864), patternmaker, engineer and inventor known for the automation of the spinning mule and the Roberts Loom
- William Edward Evans (1801–1869), Church of England divine and naturalist, curate of Llanymynech.
- Alfred Payne (1849–1927), first-class cricketer
- Kate Williams Evans (1866–1961), suffragette and activist for women's rights

== Llanymynech Football Club ==
A football club was formed in the village as far back as May 1858 in a field near Glanverniew House on the English side of the border. There is no further mention of a football club in the village until November 1879 when a club was formed following a meeting at the school room.

Llanymynech F.C. was reformed in 2011. They currently compete in Shropshire County Football League Premier Division, into which they were elected for 2025. They play their home games at Station Road on the English side of the village and play in a kit consisting of red shirt, red shorts and white- and red-hooped socks.

== See also ==
- List of hillforts in Wales
- Listed buildings in Llanymynech and Pant
