= Morda Tramway =

Coordinates: 52°49′32″N 3°3′18″W

The Morda Tramway refers to two industrial railways south of Oswestry, on the border between England and Wales. They connected the coal pits around Morda to transport networks, the first to the Montgomery Canal and the second to the Cambrian Railways at Whitehaven.

== History ==
A horse-drawn tramway running southeast was built in 1813 to serve the small coal mines of Coed-y-Go and the Bell Pits near Morda, about 1 mile south of Oswestry. It ran east of Sweeney Mountain, crossed the Oswestry-Welshpool road at Albridge Lane, and met the Montgomery Canal at a wharf by Gronwen Bridge south of Maesbury, where the canal now ends. When the large Drill colliery opened, the tramway was modernised with new rails that could handle heavier loads. By 1850 the canal had been taken over by the Shropshire Union Canal and the tramway had closed by 1879.

Railway engineer Thomas Savin saw the advantage of connecting his Cambrian Railways to the mines at Morda. He bought the Coed y Go mines and built a narrow-gauge railway from Whitehaven, starting near Nuttree Farm. It ran northwards, west of Sweeney Mountain to the small hamlet Gronwen (this section is walkable today, including a steep bank in a shallow cutting from Sweeney Fen nature reserve opening out onto a causeway as far as Gronwen), then curved west up the brook, under Brook House bridge and then swung northeast to Coed-y-Go. The railway opened in 1861 but Savin's railways collapsed in 1866 and his mine closed in 1869.

== Remains ==
Most of Savin's railway can be traced today. There is a fine bridge at Brook House, that has a high arch to accommodate the tall chimneys of the locomotives used on the line. It seems that there was an existing bridge taking the lane over Nant-y-Caws brook, now referred to as the Garden Bridge. Savin built a new bridge to take the lane over both railway and brook, and realigned the lane over the new bridge. Limestone blocks that supported the track can be seen in the field east of the bridge.
