= Owain Fychan =

Prince

Owain Fychan ap Madog (alternatively Owain Vychan ap Madoc; c. 1125 – 1187) was styled Lord of Mechain Is Coed and one of the sons of Madog ap Maredudd. His mother was Susanna, daughter of Gruffudd ap Cynan.

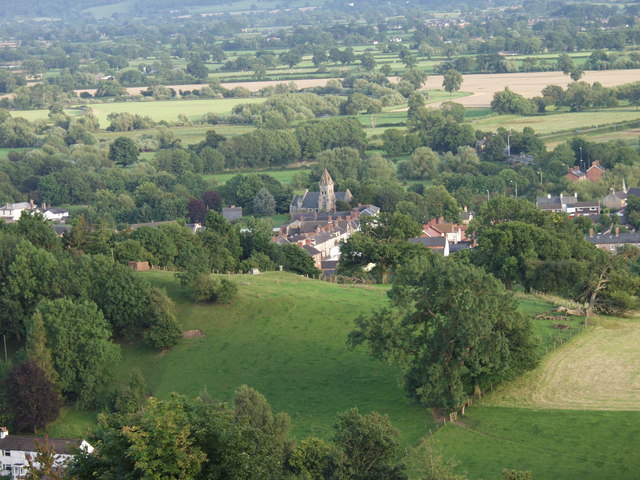
View from Llanymyenech Hill, site of Carreghofa Castle

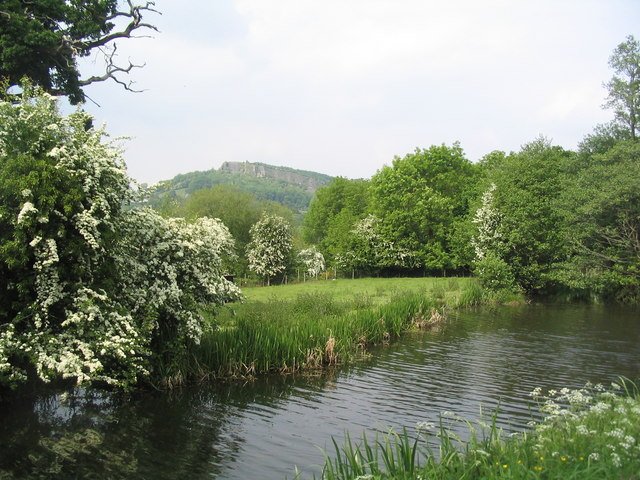
View with Llanymynech Hill in the distance

== Division of the Kingdom of Powys ==
His eldest brother, Llywelyn, was killed soon after the death of his father in 1160, at which point Powys was shared between Madog's sons Gruffydd Maelor, Owain Fychan and Owain Brogyntyn, his nephew Owain Cyfeiliog and half-brother Iorwerth Goch. Owain Fychan shared the southern portion of his father's territories with Owain Cyfeiliog. Working together they drove the English out of Carreghofa in 1163 (capturing and destroying the royal castle there, which was made of timber until fortified in stone in 1194) and Iorwerth Goch from Mochnant Is Rhaeadr in 1166.

Owain Fychan now controlled Mechain, Cynllaith, Caereinion and Mochnant Is Rhaeadr. Carreghofa Castle was retaken by Henry II in 1165, but Owain Fychan recaptured it again by 1187. The castle may have been important because of silver mining operations taking place there.

== Death ==
He was attacked at night and killed at Carreghofa Castle by Gwenwynwyn and Cadwallon, the sons of Owain Cyfeiliog. They were unable to control the territories gained to the west of Oswestry, so Owain's descendants were able to continue to rule over a much diminished realm in Mechain until the end of the 13th century. He may have had two sons - Owain Fychan ab Owain (c. 1170 - aft. 1218) and Llywelyn ab Owain (c. 1170 - aft. 1204), but some historical records of his marriage(s) have confused him with his half-brother Owain Brogyntyn.
