= Treflach =

Village in Shropshire, England

Coordinates: 52.822°N 3.101°W

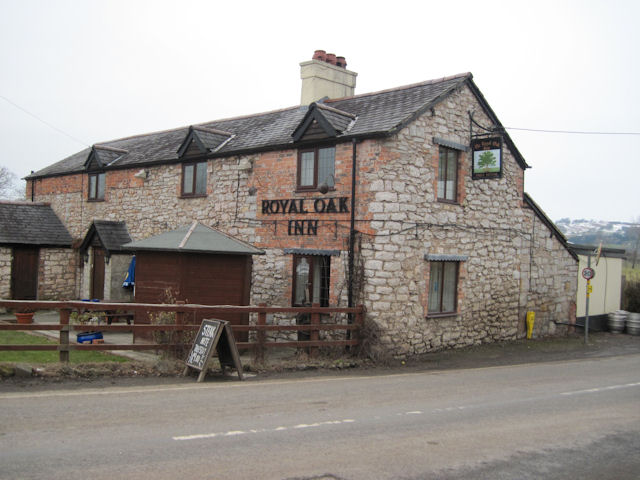
- The Royal Oak Inn public house, Treflach

- Location within Shropshire
- OS grid reference: SJ258255
- Civil parish: Oswestry Rural
- Unitary authority: Shropshire
- Ceremonial county: Shropshire
- Region: West Midlands
- Country: England
- Sovereign state: United Kingdom
- Post town: OSWESTRY
- Postcode district: SY10
- Dialling code: 01691
- Police: West Mercia
- Fire: Shropshire
- Ambulance: West Midlands
- UK Parliament: North Shropshire

Treflach is a small village near Oswestry in Shropshire, England. It is in the Oswestry Rural parish and lies between two other villages Trefonen and Nantmawr. Together these three villages have a village design statement.
