= Llanymynech and Pant =

Civil parish in Shropshire, England

Coordinates: 52.777°N 3.086°W

Llanymynech and Pant is a civil parish in Shropshire, England. The population of the parish is approximately 1,675.

The two main villages within the parish are Llanymynech and Pant, though only the English half of Llanymynech is in the parish. The Welsh half is in the community of Carreghofa, Powys.

== See also ==
- Listed buildings in Llanymynech and Pant
