= Listed buildings in Llanymynech and Pant =

Llanymynech and Pant is a civil parish in Shropshire, England. It contains 23 listed buildings that are recorded in the National Heritage List for England. All the listed buildings are designated at Grade II, the lowest of the three grades, which is applied to "buildings of national importance and special interest". The parish contains the villages of Llanymynech and Pant, and the surrounding area. The border between England and Wales passes through Llanymynech, and this is marked by a boundary stone which is listed. The area was once important for the manufacture of lime, and seven groups of lime kilns are listed, together with the much larger Hoffmann Kiln and its chimney. In Llanymynech is a listed pair of houses, a public house, and a church together with a pair of gate piers, and a memorial in the churchyard. Elsewhere, the listed buildings include farmhouses, farm buildings, an ice house, a gin wheel, a former mill, and a canal bridge.

== Buildings ==
| Name and location | Photograph | Date | Notes |
|---|---|---|---|
| Llwyntidmon Hall; 52.77967°N 3.05555°W | — | Late 16th or early 17th century | A farmhouse that has been remodelled, altered and extended. The original part is timber framed on a stone plinth; this has been truncated and partly encased in red brick. The extensions are in stone, the roof is slateed with crow-stepped gables, and there are two storeys. The 18th-century part has a T-shaped plan, the original part runs parallel with its main range, and the main range was extended to the left in the 19th century. The windows are casements, and the entrance is in the angle with the main range. |
| Llwyntidmon Mill and House; 52.78211°N 3.05439°W | — | 17th century (probable) | The house is the older, and it was extended in the 19th century. The original part is timber framed on a plinth and rendered, the extension is in brick, and the roof is slated. There is one storey and attics, the original part has two bays, and the extensions are to the left side, front and rear. The windows are casements, and there are gabled eaves dormers. The mill, no longer in use, dates from the 19th century, and is attached to the left of the house. It is in red brick with a dentilled eaves cornice, two storeys, and a lower range to the left formerly containing the mill wheel. The windows and the arch in the lower range have segmental heads. |
| Underhill Farmhouse; 52.78957°N 3.08343°W | — | 17th century (probable) | The farmhouse is partly timber framed and partly in stone, and has a slate roof with rendered coped verges. There is one storey and an attic, three bays, and a rear lean-to. On the front is a timber gabled porch, the windows are casements, and there are hip roofed dormers. |
| Llwyntidman Farmhouse and barn 52.78178°N 3.05891°W | — | Mid to late 17th century | The farmhouse is timber framed with brick infill at the rear, and refaced in brick and rendered at the front. The roof is slated, there are two storeys with a dentil cornice, and two bays. On the front is a trellised porch, and the windows are casements. To the right is a lower extension to the house, joined to a cowhouse, and beyond that is a barn that is timber framed with weatherboarding on a limestone plinth, and with a corrugated iron roof. This contains stable doors and an eaves hatch. |
| Llwyn-y-groes; 52.77785°N 3.06362°W | — | Late 17th century | A farmhouse, later a private house, it was extended and altered in the 18th, 19th and 20th centuries. It is in red brick on a limestone plinth, with bands, and a slate roof that has gables with dentilled cornices and pointed finials. There are three storeys. The main block has a central range of three bays flanked by two-bay wings. In the centre is a three-arched porch flanked by mullioned windows. Most of the other windows on the front are cross-windows, and at the rear they are a mix of casements and sashes. Attach to the main block are various extensions and a service wing to the left ending in a tile-hung square tower with a pyramidal cap and a weathervane. |
| Ice house 52.77982°N 3.05560°W | — | 18th century (probable) | The ice house is to the northeast of Llwyntidmon Hall. It is in limestone and has a barrel vault with voussoirs in the arch. |
| Gate piers, St Agatha's Church; 52.77980°N 3.08680°W | — | Late 18th century (probable) | The gate piers are at the eastern entrance to the churchyard. They are in limestone with a square section, and have moulded capping and ball finials. |
| Pant Bridge; 52.79375°N 3.07318°W | — | 1794–97 | The bridge carries a road over a disused section of the Montgomery Canal. It was designed by William Jessop and Thomas Telford, and consists of a single segmental arch. The bridge is built in red brick with chamfered coping, a string course and piers at the eastern end. |
| Limekilns at NGR SJ 2775 2306; 52.80027°N 3.07338°W | — | Early 19th century (probable) | The lime kilns are in limestone. There is a high revetment wall, and three segmental-headed kilns with hood moulds to the arches. The top is open, there are brick ovens at the rear, and a buttress on the left. |
| Limekilns at NGR SJ 2756 2272; 52.79723°N 3.07603°W | — | Early 19th century (probable) | The lime kilns are in limestone. There is a high revetment wall, two round-headed kilns, and yellow brick ovens at the rear. In front is a platform and a low retaining wall. |
| Limekilns at NGR SJ 2744 2183; 52.78910°N 3.07734°W | | Early 19th century (probable) | The lime kilns are in limestone with red brick in the arches. There is a high buttressed revetment wall, five round-headed kilns open to the top, and with brick ovens to rear. They are linked by a round-arched tunnel. |
| Limekilns at NGR SJ 2691 2191; 52.78967°N 3.08514°W | — | Early 19th century (probable) | The lime kilns are in limestone with red brick in the arches. There is a high revetment wall, three round-headed kilns, and a platform with a low retaining wall. |
| Limekilns at NGR SJ 2684 2185; 52.78921°N 3.08656°W | — | Early 19th century (probable) | The lime kilns are in limestone. There is a revetment wall, three segmental-headed kilns, and a buttress. In front is a platform and a low retaining wall. |
| Limekilns at NGR SJ 2673 2169; 52.78785°N 3.08801°W | — | Early 19th century (probable) | The lime kilns are in limestone. They have a revetment wall and there are two segmental-headed kilns. Between them is a buttress, and at the rear are brick ovens. |
| Limekilns west of Hoffmann Kiln; 52.78346°N 3.08651°W | — | Early 19th century (probable) | The lime kilns are in limestone. There is a high revetment wall with a projection. On the right is a round-headed kiln, on the projection is a segmental-headed kiln, and in front is a platform. |
| Lion Hotel and Prospect House; 52.78009°N 3.08809°W | | Early 19th century | A pair of houses, one previously a public house, in rendered brick and limestone on a plinth, with a hipped slate roof. There are three storeys, and each house has three bays, a central entrance, and sash windows. Both doorways have a plain entablature and a rectangular fanlight. Prospect House on the left has a doorcase with Doric columns, and the former Lion Hotel has a Doric porch. On the right return is a mounting block, and there are service ranges and outbuildings at the rear. |
| Boundary stone 52.78304°N 3.08958°W | — | Early to mid 19th century | The stone marks the boundary between England and Wales. It is in limestone, and has a rectangular section and a rounded top. The names of the respective counties are inscribed on its faces. |
| Cross Keys Inn; 52.78109°N 3.08865°W | — | Early to mid 19th century | A house, later a public house, it is built in limestone blocks, and has a hipped slate roof. It has three storeys, five bays, and a recessed narrow bay on the right. There are three doorways, two on the front and one in the recessed bay. The right doorway on the front has pilasters and a simple entablature, and the other doorways have plain surrounds. The windows are sashes. |
| St Agatha's Church; 52.77977°N 3.08750°W | | 1843–44 | The church, designed by Thomas Penson in Neo-Norman style, is in carboniferous limestone with dressings in yellow brick and yellow sandstone, and has slate roofs with coped verges. The church consists of a nave, a chancel, a south vestry, and a northwest tower incorporating a porch. The tower has four stages, an east doorway, clasping buttresses, a corbel table with carved human heads, and a pyramidal roof with lucarnes and a weathervane. The doorways and windows have round heads, the east window has five lights, and beneath it is a blind arcade of ten arches. |
| Dean memorial 52.77991°N 3.08748°W | — | c. 1861 | The memorial is in the churchyard of St Agatha's Church, and is to the memory of members of the Dean family. It is in cast iron, and has tall angled faces depicting an angel blowing a trumpet. On the north and south faces are inscriptions. |
| Gin wheel 52.78942°N 3.07947°W | — | Mid to late 19th century (probable) | The gin wheel has limestone side walls and a cylindrical drum. The drum has wooden boarding and cast iron spokes, and in the centre is a chain. |
| Hoffmann Chimney; 52.78351°N 3.08601°W | | 1899 | The chimney is in red brick with iron ties. It has a square section, it is slightly tapering towards the top, and has a slightly chamferd plinth and moulded capping. On the north side is a round-arched stoke hole linking it with the Hoffmann Kiln. |
| Hoffmann Kiln; 52.78373°N 3.08618°W | | 1899 | A large disused lime kiln, it is in red brick, covered in earth, and contains two tunnel vaults with air vents. The vaults are entered through 14 round-headed arches, and there are smaller round-headed kilns. |
