= Carreghofa Castle =

Castle formerly in Carreghofa, Powys, Wales

- Carreghofa, Wales, United Kingdom
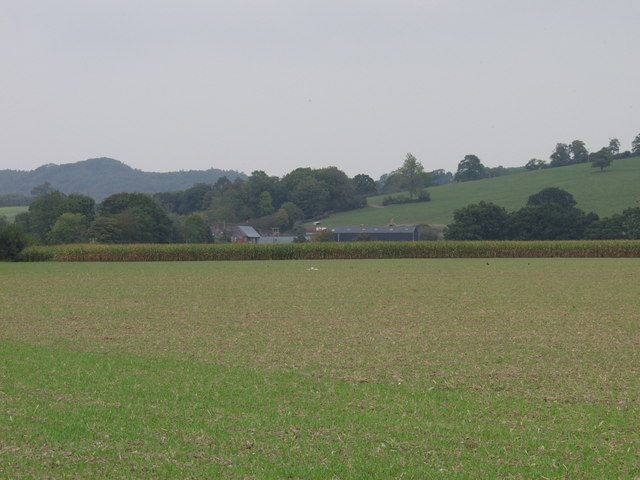
- Carreghofa Hall, which is believed to stand on the exact site of Carreghofa Castle

Site information
- Condition: ruins, archaeological site

Location
- Coordinates: 52°47′32″N 3°06′24″W

Site history
- Built: 1101
- Fate: destroyed in 1236

Carreghofa Castle (Welsh: Castell Carreghwfa) was a Norman timber and masonry castle located in the Welsh village of Carreghofa, Powys. Between its construction in 1101 and destruction in 1236, it was the site of many battles between rival Welsh and English forces. Archaeological remains of the castle's perimeter, uncovered in the late 19th century, are all that remains of the structure.

== Medieval disputes ==
Carreghofa Castle was built in 1101 by Robert de Bellême in the North Wales border regions, without the permission of the newly crowned King Henry I. In the following years the castle, among others like Bridgenorth Castle, was captured by Henry I and transformed into a military base for English forces. Carreghofa Castle was built on land which was heavily disputed, largely due to its location in the Welsh Marches. This was a politically tumultuous region in the medieval Kingdom of Powys, founded in the 5th century, which began experiencing increased threats from the east following the Norman Conquest of England in 1066. In building Carreghofa Castle, de Bellême was directly allying himself with the princes of Powys, the sons of Bleddyn ap Cynfyn, against the English monarchy.

This political tension is evidenced in the castle's frequent shifts of ownership and alliances throughout its 12th-century lifespan. Carreghofa was captured by the Welsh in 1163 with the help of the King of Gwynedd, before being lost again to King Henry II in 1165. In this latter instance Owain Fychan, one of the princes of Powys, was given permission to retain the castle after switching allegiance to the English monarch, though he was killed in 1187 during an attack on the castle by his nephews Gwenwynwyn and Cadwallon ab Owain. A decade later in 1197, Gwenwynwyn, the second ruler of the southern Powys region, was voluntarily given ownership of the castle by the English in exchange for surrendering Rhys ap Gruffudd to them. At this time, Carreghofa Castle was probably also used for silver mining. The castle switched hands again to Robert de Vieuxpont in 1212, after a series of Welsh defeats in the area. He is said to have rebuilt the castle.

Carreghofa Castle is believed to have been destroyed a final time in the 1230s (approximately 1236) as part of Llewelyn ap Iorwerth’s campaigns against English rule in Wales.

== Rediscovery ==
The ruins of Carreghofa Castle were rediscovered in 1871, when workers uncovered an underground room and perimeter stone foundations. Subsequently reburied, the prominent earthworks are all that remain of the old castle structure. A 17th-century farm complex, Carreghofa Hall, is believed to be built directly above the old castle and is designated a Grade II listed building.
