= William Evans (priest) =

English divine and naturalist

William Edward Evans (8 June 1801 – 21 November 1869) was an English divine and naturalist.

== Life ==
Evans was born on 8 June 1801 in Shrewsbury. He inherited a taste for poetry and natural history from his father, John Evans M.D., a physician there and author of a poem in four books on bees (1806–13). His mother was Jane Wilson. A brother, Robert Wilson Evans, became the Archdeacon of Westmorland and Furness. From Shrewsbury School, then run by Samuel Butler, Evans gained a scholarship at Clare Hall, Cambridge, where he proceeded to the degree of B.A. in 1823 and M.A. in 1826.

After taking holy orders, Evans became curate of Llanymynech, Shropshire, until his marriage to a cousin, Elizabeth Evans, when he was presented to the living of Criggion, Montgomeryshire. This, however, he resigned to live at Burton Court, Leominster, which his wife had inherited, and to hold the sole charge of the parish of Monkland. In 1841 he was appointed prebendary of Hereford and praelector of the cathedral. After holding Monkland for eighteen years, in 1850, Evans accepted the living of Madley with Tibberton, Herefordshire. In 1861 he became canon of Hereford Cathedral. His health failed for the last two or three years of his life, and he died in the Close, Hereford on 21 November 1869, aged 68.

== Works ==
Evans was an effective preacher, a careful student of animals, especially birds, and an angler. His major work was The Song of the Birds; or Analogies of Animal and Spiritual Life, 1845, drawing lessons from birds' habits. There are 22 chapters on England's main songbirds. He wrote also Sermons on Genesis, Family Prayers, First Revelations of God to Man (Sermons), and a Letter to the Bishop on Diocesan Education, 1850 (to Renn Hampden), with some sermons.

== Family ==
Evans left one daughter, and three sons, one of whom became the vicar of Holmer, Herefordshire.
