= Llanymynech Golf Club =

Golf club on the border of Wales and England

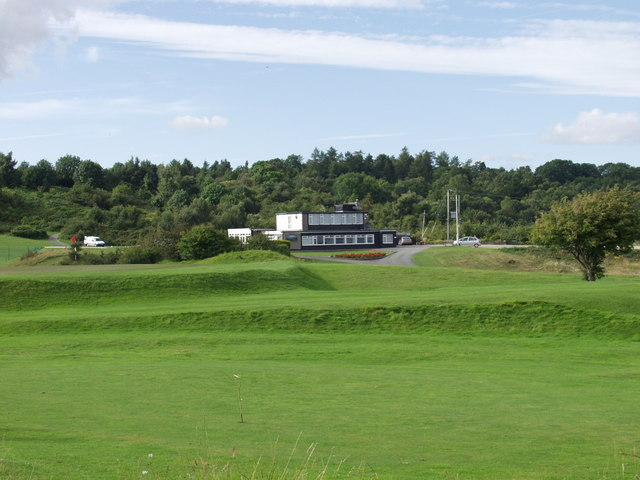
- Llanymynech Golf Club clubhouse
- Interactive map of Llanymynech Golf Club
- 52.792°N 3.089°W

Club information
- Location: Powys, Wales; Shropshire, England
- Established: 1933
- Type: Private
- Tota holes: 18
- Website: llanymynechgolfclub.co.uk

18 hole
- Par: 70
- Length: whites – 6036, yellows – 5873, reds – 5196 (yds)

6 hole short course
- Par: 18

Llanymynech Golf Course is situated atop Llanymynech Hill overlooking the villages of Llanymynech and Pant, approximately 9 miles (14 km) from Welshpool, right on the Welsh/English border. From the course it is possible to view 12 of the old 'shire counties', including Shropshire, Cheshire, Flintshire and Denbighshire. The course is also surrounded by sheer cliffs and steep banks. There is a section of Offa's Dyke on the western edge of the course, and the Offa's Dyke Path crosses the course.

== A unique golf course ==
The course has a unique claim to fame since it straddles the English-Welsh border, with 15 holes in Wales and three in England. On holes one to four golfers tee-off in Wales, and then reach England on the fourth green. They remain in England until returning to Wales for the seventh tee.

As of 11 May 2020 the club was seeking legal advice as to whether it could reopen during the Coronavirus pandemic. Different rules applied regarding lockdown to England and Wales. The Prime Minister, Boris Johnson had announced that golf clubs could reopen but this applied only in England. The club is governed by England Golf, which was expecting clubs to reopen on 13 May 2020, but in Wales the regulations then remained unchanged. In Wales people were banned from driving to exercise outside their local area or with anyone outside of their household and gatherings of more than two people were an offence. The Welsh Government suggested the conditions were not yet right to resume golf in Wales. However, the club reopened with safeguards and restrictions in place. It would be another year until cross-border restrictions were relaxed.
