= Morda =

Village in Shropshire, England

- Civil parish: Oswestry Rural
- Unitary authority: Shropshire
- Ceremonial county: Shropshire
- Region: West Midlands
- Country: England
- Sovereign state: United Kingdom
- Post town: OSWESTRY
- Postcode district: SY10
- Dialling code: 01691
- Police: West Mercia
- Fire: Shropshire
- Ambulance: West Midlands
- UK Parliament: North Shropshire

Morda is a village on the outskirts of the town of Oswestry, Shropshire, located near the border of England with Wales.

The village is named after the River Morda, a tributary of the River Vyrnwy.

== History ==
=== The Morda Valley ===
Prior to 1792, Morda comprised the Drill Inn, perhaps one or two farms, and possibly a small flour mill. The following decades of the Industrial Revolution saw several factories and mills spring up along the banks of the village's namesake river, which provided a ready source of power for machinery. These mills were used to grind corn for flour, and to manufacture textiles, paper and animal products. Dwellings were also built at this time to house the local workforce, which comprised blacksmiths, wheelwrights and millwrights among other craftspeople.

The village's main enterprise at the end of the 18th century was that of Warren Roberts & Co., originally of Manchester, who opened several mills for the printing and dyeing of calico. Calico activities ceased in Morda around 1818.

The village's present school was erected in 1872, replacing one that operated in a malt kiln behind the Drill Inn from around 1850.

=== Coal mining and brick making ===
There were several good sources of coal in Shropshire and in its heyday in the 1800s the local mining industry rivalled neighbouring Staffordshire in its output. Contributing to this productivity was coal extracted from Morda, Coed-y-go and Trefonen. The coal in the area was often close to the surface and accordingly the bell pit was a common method of extraction.

By the turn of the 19th century, the Ellesmere Canal and the Shropshire Union offshoot opened up the markets to the north and for some fifty years, much coal mining would take place in Morda. In 1813, the Morda Tramway was laid down to transport coal to the canal at Maesbury. In 1860, local entrepreneur Thomas Savin constructed a railway to link the Morda pits to the main line of the Cambrian Railway at Whitehaven, near Llynclys. The railway opened in 1861 but Savin's bankruptcy in 1866 ended matters and his mine closed in 1869.

As some of the mines in the area became flooded, their owners turned instead to utilising the clay dug out as a by-product of mining. This clay was most often used in the making of bricks and pottery items.

Coal extraction had mostly ended in the Morda field by 1900.

=== Morda House ===
The village was home to Morda House, otherwise known as the House of Industry or Oswestry Workhouse, originally opened in 1792 as the communal workhouse for Oswestry, Chirk and Llansilin. After the Poor Law Amendment Act 1834 the workhouse's scope was extended to take in people from many more of the surrounding parishes.

The main workhouse was a substantial three-storey building that could accommodate up to 300 inmates. In 1891, a 16-bed isolation hospital was erected to the south-east of the workhouse. This later became the Oswestry and Chirk Isolation Hospital, and then Greenfields Hospital. Since the 1980s the former hospital has housed Morda & Sweeney Social Club.

The main workhouse building was destroyed by fire in 1982. The only surviving part of it was a two-storey section that was later incorporated into a private residence.

== Morda United F.C. ==
The village was home to the football club Morda United, which played at the Weston Road Ground. The club was first founded as Morda F.C. in the 1800s, but folded in the mid-1900s. The club was reformed in the 1970s under the name of Morda United F.C. and played throughout central Wales and the West Midlands for more than 40 years. Notable success came in 1991, when the club became Mid Wales Football League champions. Following a period of dormancy from 2017, Morda United reformed and returned to playing action in 2020 in the Shropshire County Football League. However the club folded again in June 2025.

== Other ==
Morda features heavily in Dear Thief (2014), a novel by the award-winning author Samantha Harvey.
