= Ashfield, Shropshire =

Hamlet in Shropshire, England

Coordinates: 52.824°N 3.027°W

Ashfield
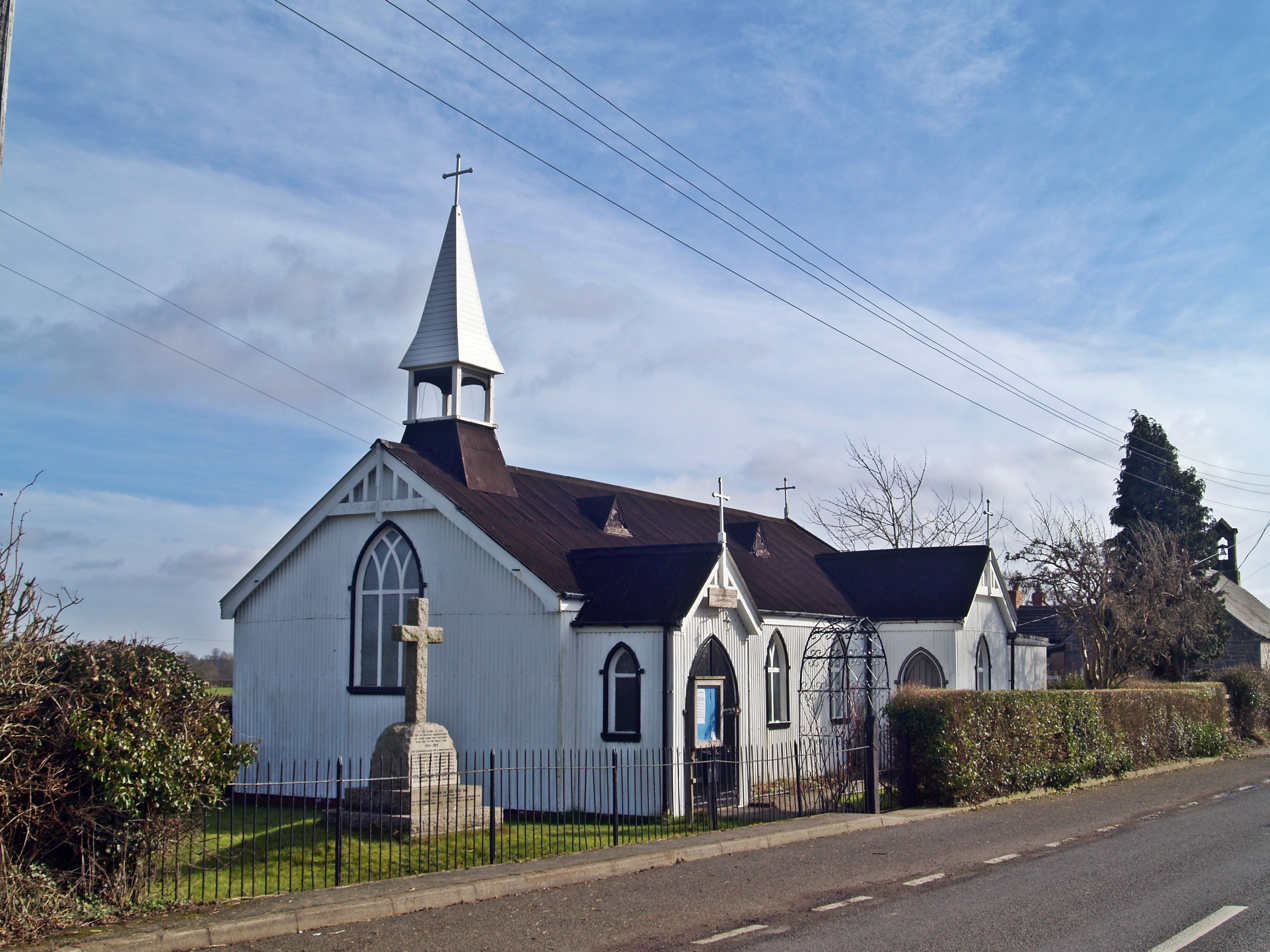
- St. Johns Church, Ashfield, Maesbury

- Location within Shropshire
- OS grid reference: SJ308256
- Civil parish: Oswestry Rural
- Unitary authority: Shropshire
- Ceremonial county: Shropshire
- Region: West Midlands
- Country: England
- Sovereign state: United Kingdom
- Post town: OSWESTRY
- Postcode district: SY10
- Dialling code: 01691
- Police: West Mercia
- Fire: Shropshire
- Ambulance: West Midlands
- UK Parliament: North Shropshire

Ashfield is a hamlet in Oswestry Rural civil parish, Shropshire, England.

It is situated about a minor crossroads, just to the northwest of Maesbury Marsh, at an elevation of 84 metres (276 ft).

Maesbury Primary School was located here; it closed in 2013 but was reopened after renovation in 2017 as a children's nursery. Also located there is Maesbury's village church of St John. Beside the church is the village war memorial in the form of a rough-hewn cross. It was unveiled following the First World War by Brigadier-General J V Campbell VC, in 1921. Local men who died serving in the Second were later added.
