= Gwenwynwyn ab Owain Cyfeiliog =

Lord of Cyfeiliog (died 1216)

- Lord of Cyfeiliog
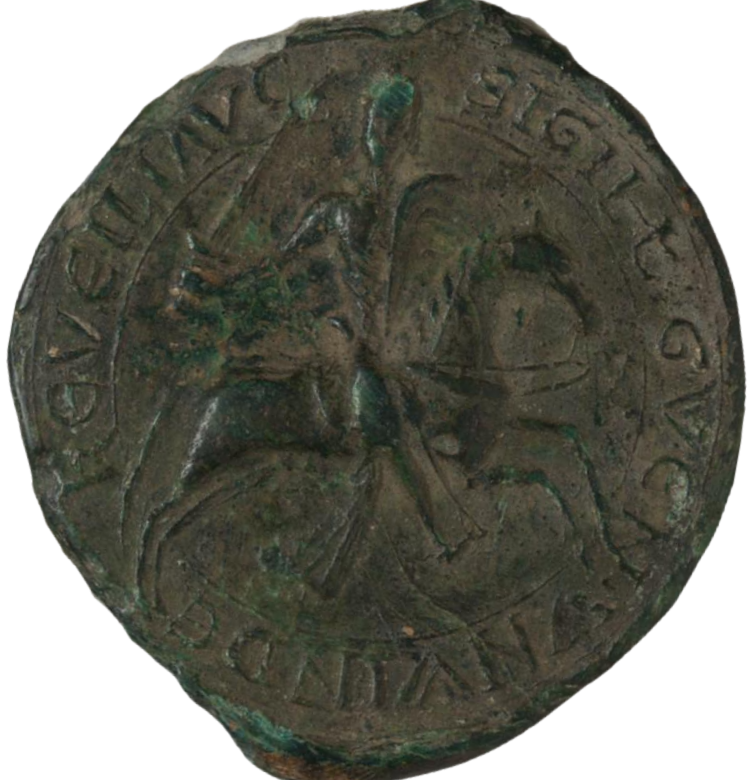
- Sigil of Gwenwynwyn from a charter of 12 February 1204/5 granting land to Strata Marcella, reading SIGILL : GWENWNWIN : DE : KEVEILIAVC
- Successor: Gruffudd ap Gwenwynwyn
- Died: 1216; Chester
- Noble family: Lleision
- Spouses: Marged ferch Rhys; Margred, d. Robert Corbet of Cause
- Issue: Madog ap Gwenwynwyn; Gruffudd ap Gwenwynwyn
- Father: Owain Cyfeiliog
- Mother: Gwenllian ferch Owain Gwynedd

Gwenwynwyn ab Owain Cyfeiliog (died c. 1216) was the last major ruler of mid Wales before the completion of the Norman English invasion. He was one of few native rulers to represent a real threat to the rule of Llywelyn the Great.

== Lineage ==
Gwenwynwyn ruled southern Powys (Powys Wenwynwyn) from 1195, and was given charge of the kingdom following the retirement of his father Owain Cyfeiliog. Prior to this, in 1187, he had made an attack on Carreghofa Castle with his brother Cadwallon, in the course of which they killed their father's cousin and former ally, Owain Fychan. He had assisted Maelgwn ap Rhys in taking Aberystwyth Castle and capturing Maelgwn's brother Gruffydd ap Rhys II, whom he handed over to the English. His military ambitions were temporarily thwarted by his failure at the siege of Painscastle, when Gruffydd returned to battle.

Owain Cyfeiliog had been a notable poet as well as a leader of the resistance against English invasion, and chose to enter the abbey of Strata Marcella in later life; he died in 1197, two years after becoming a monk. Gwenwynwyn continued his father's strategy and is thought to have been one of the Welsh rulers who made an agreement with King Richard I of England not to attack his kingdom while he was away on crusade. In 1199, he made peace with Richard's successor, John. He was rewarded with marriage to an English noblewoman, Margaret Corbet, the daughter of the Lord of the border territory of Caus, around 1200, as well as the grant of the manor of Ashford.

== Conflict with Llywelyn the Great ==
Gwenwynwyn's possession of Powys Wenwynwyn brought him into conflict with Llywelyn the Great, ruler of Gwynedd, who was keen to extend his own jurisdiction over the whole of Wales. In 1202 there was an uneasy peace between the two Welsh princes as Gwenwynwyn began attacking Marcher lords, thus losing John's favour; this eventually resulted in his being imprisoned at Shrewsbury.

== Conflict with King John ==
King John favoured Gwenwynwyn until a marriage alliance was made between Llywelyn and John's illegitimate daughter. The two native princes kept their distance until 1207. As a result of Gwenwynwyn's aggression, John took him prisoner in 1208 and confiscated his lands, while Llywelyn seized Ceredigion, Aberystwyth, and Powys.

Gwenwynwyn's lands were restored to him as a result of John's intervention after two years. Freed by the King, he recovered most of his possessions, and accompanied John on an expedition into Wales. However, his continued resentment towards the English led him into an alliance with Llywelyn, which lasted from 1212 until 1216, when John again restored some of Gwenwynwyn's property and the two Welsh princes fell out again. Gwenwynwyn was pursued by Llywelyn, who took his lands, and he took refuge in Chester.

== Death and legacy ==
Llywelyn invaded Powys, backed by other leaders of the Welsh alliance against the English. Gwenwynwyn, having been driven out of his lands, is believed to have died or been killed later that same year. He was succeeded by Gruffydd ap Gwenwynwyn, his son by Margaret Corbet, who was eventually restored to his lands after Llywelyn's death, and continued to feud with the princes of Gwynedd.

Regnal titles
Preceded by Owain Cyfeiliog	Prince of Powys Wenwynwyn; 1195–1216	Succeeded by Llywelyn the Great
