= Pant, Shropshire =

Village in Shropshire, England

Coordinates: 52.794°N 3.075°W

Pant
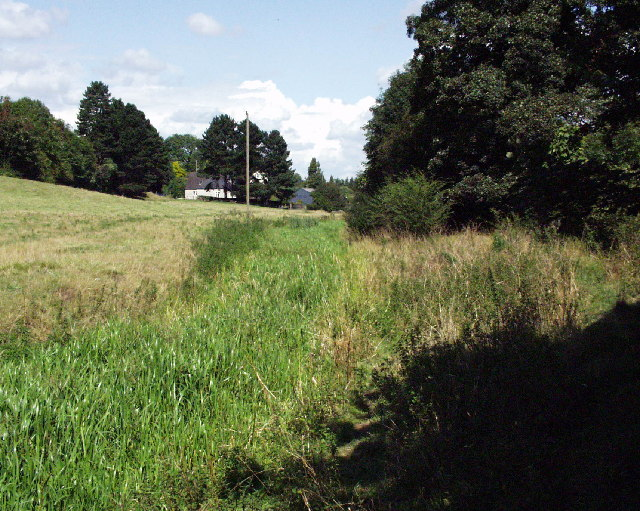
- Course of the Montgomery Canal at Pant, Shropshire

- Location within Shropshire
- OS grid reference: SJ275224
- Civil parish: Llanymynech and Pant
- Unitary authority: Shropshire
- Ceremonial county: Shropshire
- Region: West Midlands
- Country: England
- Sovereign state: United Kingdom
- Post town: OSWESTRY
- Postcode district: SY10
- Dialling code: 01691
- Police: West Mercia
- Fire: Shropshire
- Ambulance: West Midlands
- UK Parliament: North Shropshire

Pant is a village in Shropshire, England. It lies near the border with Wales. Pant means 'hollow' in Welsh: it is located directly below the disused mines at Llanymynech Rocks Nature Reserve. The population at the 2011 census is listed under the Civil Parish of Llanymynech and Pant. The built-up area of Pant and Llanymynech is roughly 2,000.

Pant has a few notable features: Llanymynech Golf Club is unique as the only 18 hole course in the UK to straddle the border between two countries; Llanymynech Ogof, a copper mine where many Roman artefacts have been found; Bryn Offa Church of England Primary School, a school built after the closure of four schools in the surrounding area; and a large gin wheel in the village. This quiet village was once much more lively, with several shops and a post office.

== History ==
The Llanymynech Rocks Reserve has known human activity since Roman times when it is known to have had a copper mine. More recently there has been a limestone quarry. At their prime, Pant and Llanymynech had a tramway from the mines down to various kilns in the villages. Pant's state-of-the-art kilns by the Montgomery Canal were used for only a short period after which they were superseded by the more efficient hoffman kiln at Llanymynech.

== Transport ==
Pant was once on the railway line from Whitchurch to Welshpool and also on the Montgomery Canal; they are both now disused.

Cambrian Heritage Railways have restored 0.75 miles (1.21 km) of the railway line between Pant and Llynclys as a heritage railway. Trains operate as far as Penygarreg Lane Halt at present. The trust often holds steam events on the restored stretch. There are plans to reopen the whole line from Gobowen and Oswestry to Welshpool. Work is also underway to make the Montgomery Canal navigable through the village again.

Pant residents are inconvenienced by the busy A483 road, which runs through the centre of the village. A possible bypass around Pant and Llanymynech had long been discussed, but there were no firm plans for this until its authorisation was announced in the 2020 budget.

== See also ==
- Listed buildings in Llanymynech and Pant
