= River Morda =

River in Shropshire, England

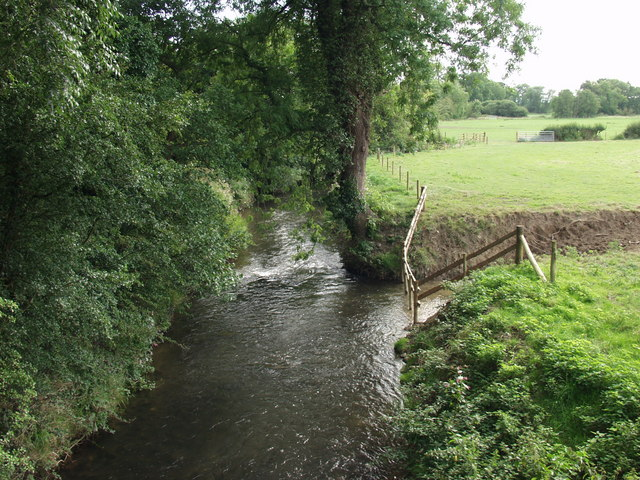
- River Morda at Morton Bridge

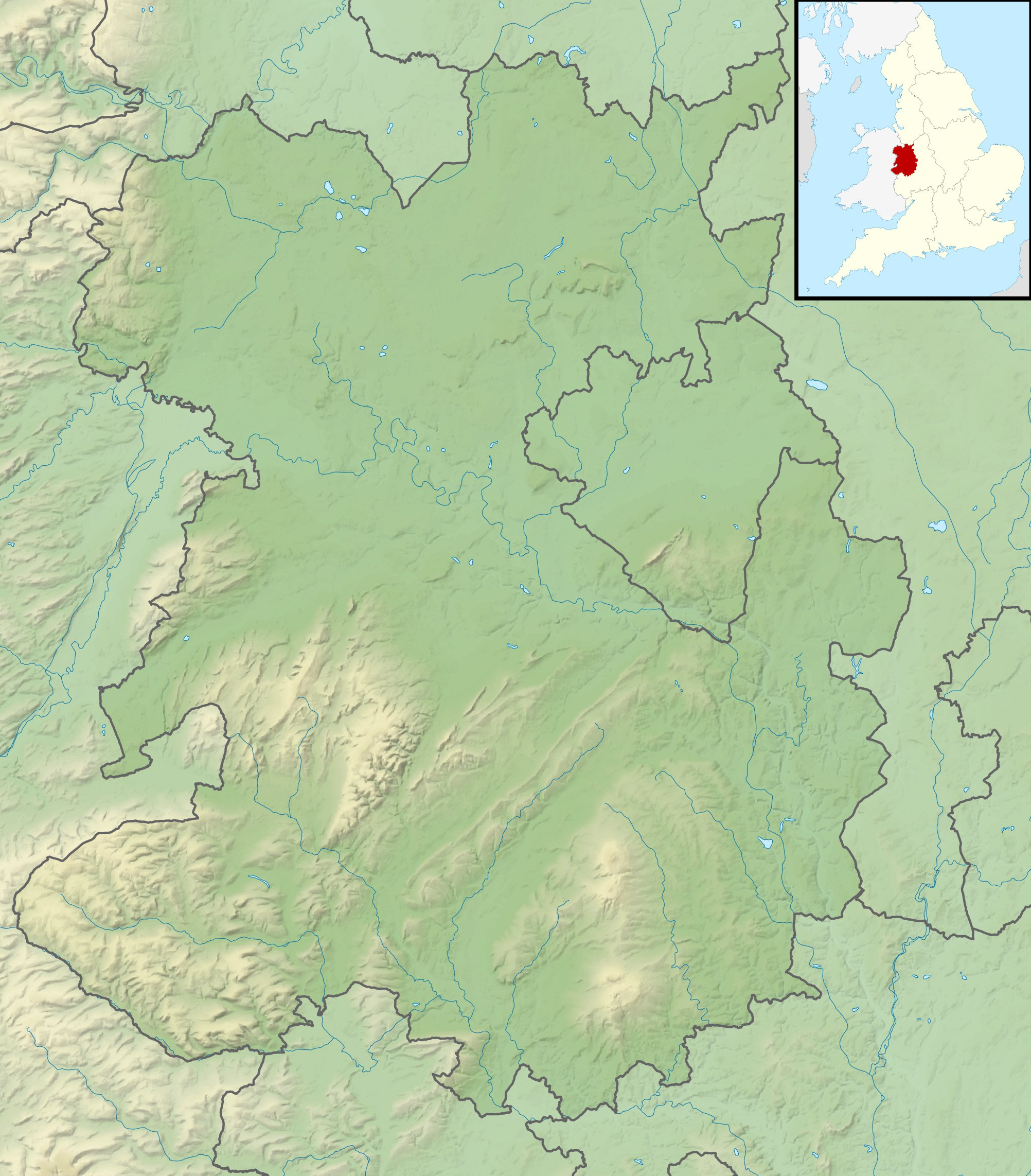
- Location of the mouth within Shropshire

Location
- Country: Wales, England
- Counties: Powys, Shropshire

Physical characteristics
- Mouth
  - location: River Vyrnwy, Shropshire
  - coordinates: 52.76736°N 3.0326°W
- Length: 27.1 km (16.8 mi)

The River Morda is a minor river in Wrexham County Borough and Powys, Wales and Shropshire, England, lying mainly to the south-west of the town of Oswestry. The river flows in a generally eastward direction from its source near Llechrydau, Wrexham, across the England–Wales border to its convergence with the River Vyrnwy near Domgay.

The river's drainage basin covers an area of approximately 30 km^{2}, which includes one relatively large tributary to the east amongst several smaller streams that flow into the main channel.

The predominant land use along the course of the river is agriculture, with large expanses of open pasture. Beyond Llawnt, the river flows through wooded terrain for about a kilometre before reaching Morda where the river encounters the first urbanised area along its route.

The main stem of the river has been divided into two sections for classification purposes with a total length of 27.1 kilometres (16.8 mi).

== 2017 pollution incident ==
On 19 January 2017, a report of acid pollution in the River Morda was made to the Environment Agency. The pollution incident resulted in significant fish mortality. An investigation into the cause and impact of the incident was subsequently launched by the Environment Agency and United Utilities.
