= Rhydycroesau =

Village in Shropshire, England

Coordinates: 52.869°N 3.128°W

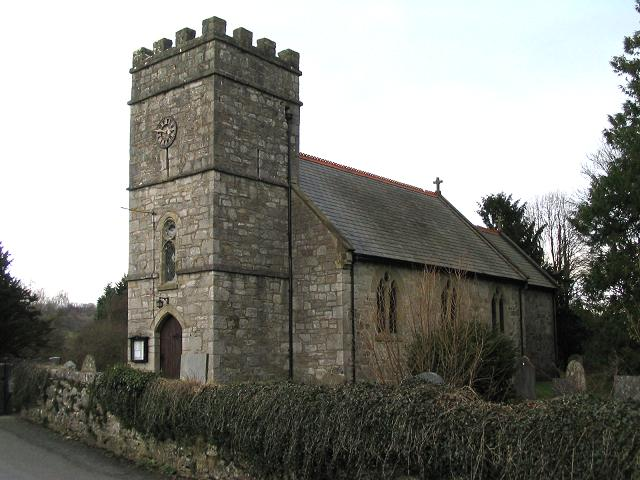
- Christ Church, Rhydycroesau

- Location within Shropshire
- OS grid reference: SJ240308
- Civil parish: Oswestry Rural
- Principal area: Powys
- Unitary authority: Shropshire
- Preserved county: Montgomeryshire
- Ceremonial county: Shropshire
- Region: West Midlands
- Country: England; Wales
- Sovereign state: United Kingdom
- Post town: OSWESTRY
- Postcode district: SY10
- Dialling code: 01691
- Police: West Mercia
- Fire: Shropshire
- Ambulance: West Midlands
- UK Parliament: North Shropshire

Rhydycroesau is a tiny village on the English-Welsh border, 3.25 miles (5.23 km) west of Oswestry on the B4580 road. It lies partly in the Shropshire parish of Oswestry Rural; the other part is in Montgomeryshire, Powys.

== History ==
Rhydycroesau is an old Welsh village in the Welsh Marches. Archaeological research has found evidence of Roman and early Anglo-Saxon settlements within 10 km of the modern village. The name is Welsh, meaning Ford of the Crosses.

=== 19th century ===
The former Rectory was built in 1840 from the local stone for £1,260, which included constructing the church and village school, now the village hall, into the bargain. The church is in Wales, and the rectory is in England, the only such instance in modern times.

The first Rector was the Reverend Robert Williams, appointed in 1837. A native of Conwy, where his father was the Vicar, he was educated at Christ Church, Oxford (MA). He was a renowned scholar of his time, who wrote the Biography of Eminent Welshmen and the Cornish Dictionary. In 1835, whilst curate of Llangernyw, he published The History and Antiquities of the town of Aberconwy. In 1879, Reverend Williams left to become the Rector of Culmington, near Ludlow, where he died in 1881.

He was described as "ponderous and pedantic, big and burly, waddling as he walked with three or four pupils at his heels." The 1861 census gives details of his household. He had two sisters, a dairymaid, a housemaid, and two farm servants living in. One of his favourite sayings was that "a goose is a very awkward bird, being a little too much for one, but not enough for two." He was a dull preacher, using the same sermons repeatedly, reading them in a monotone. He was not much liked by his parishioners and maintained a congregation of as many as a dozen worshippers.

Two more vicars followed: the Reverend Richard Richardson-Jones from 1879 until 1908, and the Reverend William Arthur Morris until 1949. Both were more popular figures, and congregations regularly reached 100 or more.

=== 20th century ===
In 1920, the Church in Wales was disestablished, and a referendum was held in the village to decide if the Church should go to the Church of England or the Church in Wales. The vote was in favour of the Church of England, and so it is to this day, one of the few Church of England churches situated in Wales. The church continues to hold regular services.

In 1951, the church sold the Rectory into private hands and bought by a dentist and his family. First-hand accounts indicate that the house was always cold and almost without carpets. Water was pumped from a well, and up to five fires had to be laid and lit each morning to provide any warmth. The place was, at times, in a state of near collapse.

It was not until 1981 that the then-owners opened the Rectory to the public, first as a restaurant and subsequently as a hotel. The village school is now the village hall, and has been substantially extended recently due to the high level of local activities held there.

== Pantomime ==
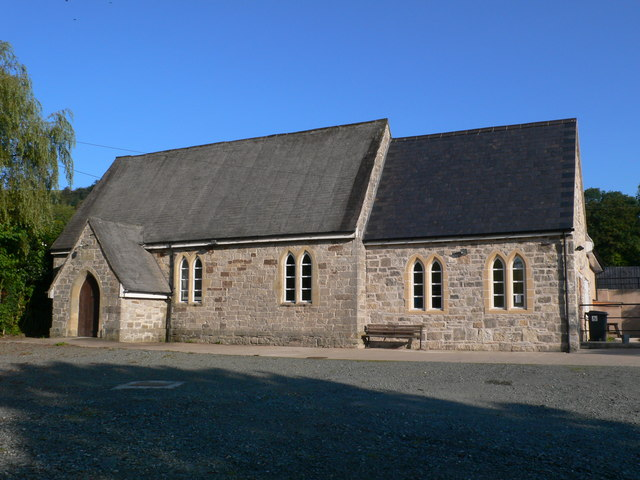
Rhydycroesau Village Hall, portions built 1850

Rhydycroesau is well known locally for its pantomimes, which are hosted every year in January and February at the Village Hall with a cast of people from the local area. In 2016, the group performed for over 36 years, making a new show each year.

== In literature ==
Rhydycroesau is the setting for some key action in the medieval mystery novel Monk's Hood by Ellis Peters, the third in her series featuring Brother Cadfael, set in 1138.
