= Oswestry Rural =

Civil parish in Shropshire, England

Coordinates: 52.8357°N 3.0717°W

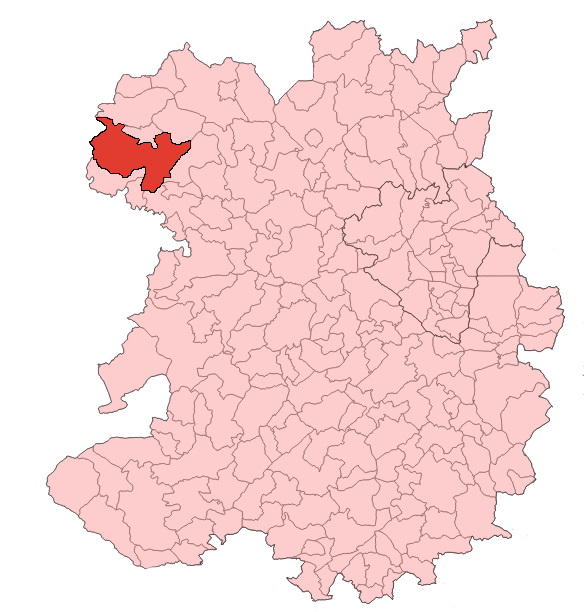
- Civil parishes in the ceremonial county of Shropshire, with Oswestry Rural highlighted

- Location within Shropshire
- Area: 62 km^{2} (24 sq mi)
- Population: 4,504 (2011 Census)
  - Density: 73/km^{2} (190/sq mi)
- OS grid reference: SJ279270
- Civil parish: Oswestry Rural
- Unitary authority: Shropshire Council
- Ceremonial county: Shropshire
- Region: West Midlands
- Country: England
- Sovereign state: United Kingdom
- Post town: Oswestry
- Postcode district: SY10
- Dialling code: 01691
- ISO 3166 code: GB-SHR
- Police: West Mercia
- Fire: Shropshire
- Ambulance: West Midlands
- UK Parliament: North Shropshire
- Website: www.oswestryrural-pc.gov.uk

Oswestry Rural is a geographically large civil parish located in Shropshire, England. It is situated south of Oswestry itself, and extends from the border with Wales in the west. It covers an area of 62 square kilometres (24 sq mi) and had a population of 4,504 in the 2011 census

The parish includes the villages of Rhydycroesau, Trefonen, Morda, Maesbury, and various other hamlets including Treflach, Whitehaven, Tyn-y-coed, Croesau Bach, Ball, Ashfield and Aston Square.

== See also ==
- Listed buildings in Oswestry Rural
