= Maesbury =

Settlement in Shropshire, England

Coordinates: 52.824°N 3.026°W

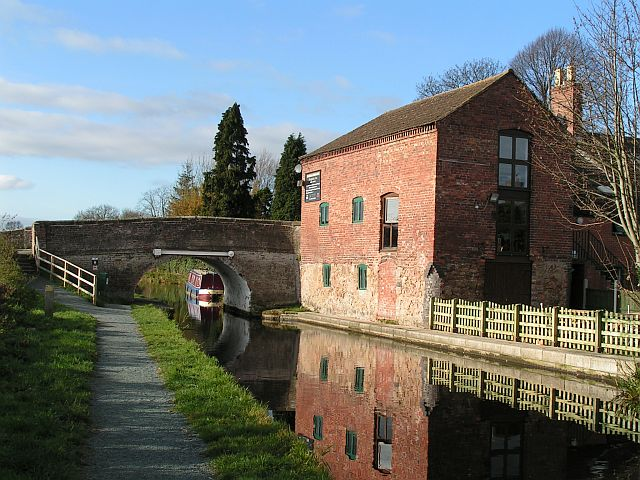
- The Montgomery Canal passing through Maesbury Marsh

- Location within Shropshire
- OS grid reference: SJ308256
- Civil parish: Oswestry Rural
- Unitary authority: Shropshire
- Ceremonial county: Shropshire
- Region: West Midlands
- Country: England
- Sovereign state: United Kingdom
- Post town: OSWESTRY
- Postcode district: SY10
- Dialling code: 01691
- Police: West Mercia
- Fire: Shropshire
- Ambulance: West Midlands
- UK Parliament: North Shropshire

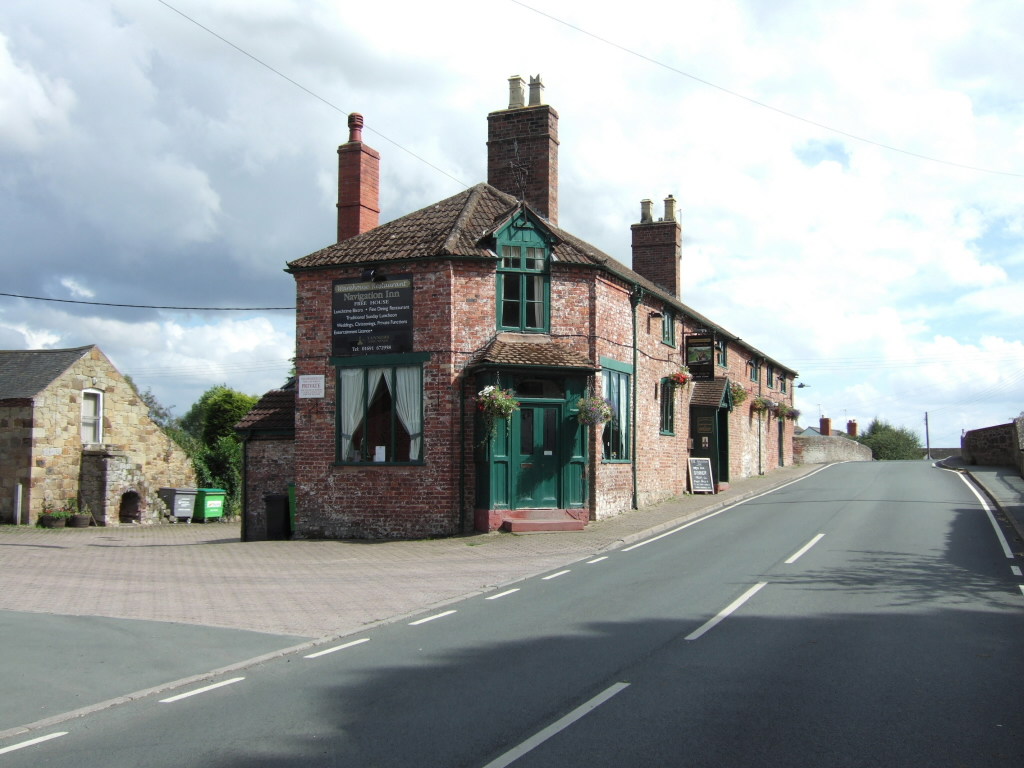
The Navigation Inn in Maesbury Marsh

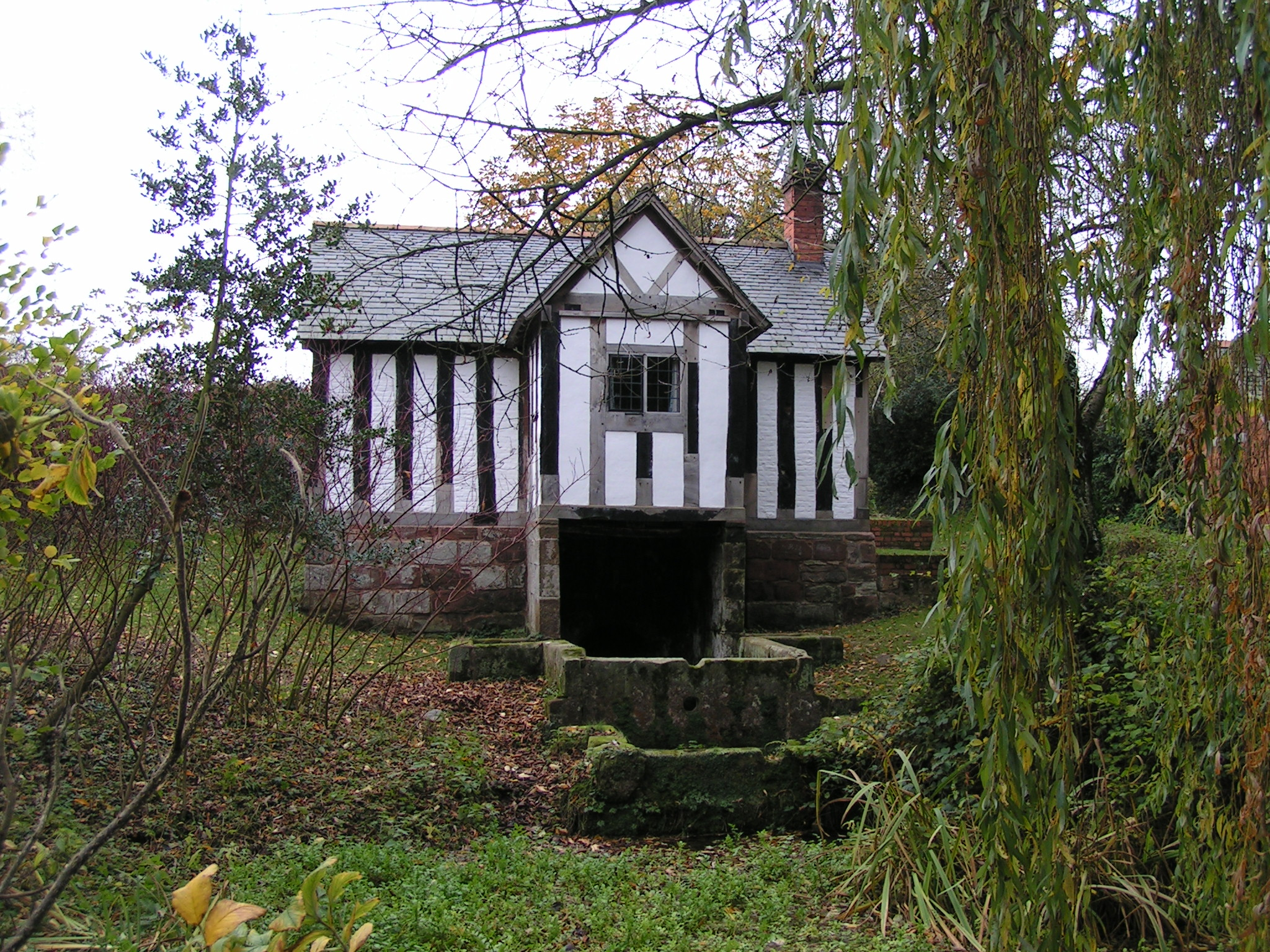
St Winifred's Well, Woolston

Maesbury is a small scattered community in Shropshire, England, south of the town of Oswestry, falling within the Oswestry Rural parish.

The name is derived from maes, meaning field or plain in Brythonic Welsh, and burh, meaning fort in Old English.

Maesbury traditionally consists of five hamlets: Ball, Gwernybrenin, Newbridge, Maesbury and Maesbury Marsh, though the wider area now includes Ashfield, Aston and Woolston.

A biennial canal festival is held in Maesbury on the Montgomery Canal which passes through the village.

The local small primary school, Maesbury Primary School, located at Ashfield Close, closed its doors in 2013. The building reopened as a children's nursery after renovation in 2017.

The village has a war memorial in the form of a rough-hewn cross near the roadside beside the church. It was unveiled following the First World War by Brigadier-General J V Campbell VC, in 1921. Local men who died serving in the Second were later added.

The village is connected to the nearest town Oswestry via the 576 bus route which also connects to Shrewsbury.

Maesbury Marsh is at the southern end of the area. There is a public house here, located by the main road bridge over the Montgomery Canal, called The Navigation Inn. There is another public house in Ball called The Original Ball on the road into Oswestry.

Local restoration of the Montgomery Canal has been completed and it connects with the Shropshire Union Canal/Ellesmere Canal further to the north east. Further restoration is taking place to the south west through Crickheath. There is a newly constructed nature reserve at Bridge 81, a lift bridge over a minor road, by Bridge House.

Canal Central, an environmentally-friendly building incorporating a post office, shop, tearoom, accommodation and bike and canoe hire was built alongside the canal just to the west of Spiggots Bridge (No.80) in 2006. It has a miniature railway and offers horse-drawn boat trips during the summer. Mooring is available along sections of the canal at Maesbury Marsh. Bridge 81 is a lift bridge, which requires a windlass to operate, and immediately to its west, the Mill Arm (or Peate's Branch) has been restored for much of its length giving access to a boatyard and private moorings. A feeder from Morda Brook enters the arm at its far end, where Maesbury Hall Mill was located. This was a corn mill worked by A & A Peate, from whom the arm gets its alternative name.

In nearby Woolston is St Winifred's Well, which is believed to have been a resting place for monks travelling from Holywell to Shrewsbury Abbey with her body.
