= Carreghofa =

Community in Montgomeryshire, Wales

Carreghofa: Welsh: Carreghwfa
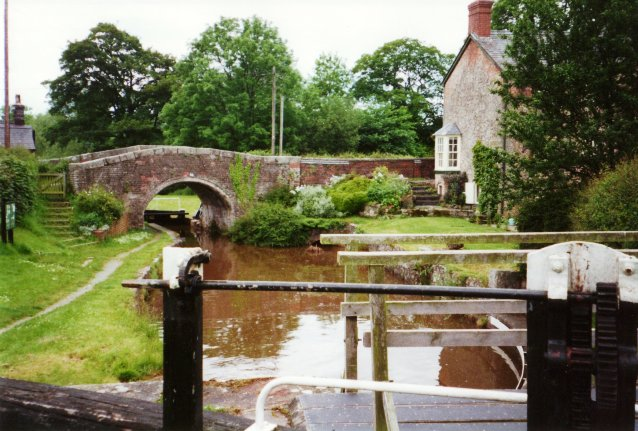
- Population: 667
- OS grid reference: SJ 258 205
  - Cardiff: 89.6 mi (144.2 km)
  - London: 153.6 mi (247.2 km)
- Community: Carreghofa
- Principal area: Powys
- Country: Wales
- Sovereign state: United Kingdom
- Post town: Llanfechain
- Police: Dyfed-Powys
- Fire: Mid and West Wales
- Ambulance: Welsh
- List of places UK Wales Powys 52.777°N 3.101°W Map of the community

Carreghofa (Welsh: Carreghwfa) is a community in Montgomeryshire, Powys, Wales, and is 89.6 miles (144.2 km) from Cardiff and 153.6 miles (247.2 km) from London. In 2011 the population of Carreghofa was 667 with 10.2% of them able to speak Welsh. 78% of people had no form of Welsh identity.

The largest settlement in the community is the Welsh part of the village of Llanymynech (the western part) on the border with England.

== See also ==
- List of localities in Wales by population
