= Trefonen =

Village in Shropshire, England

Coordinates: 52.833°N 3.101°W

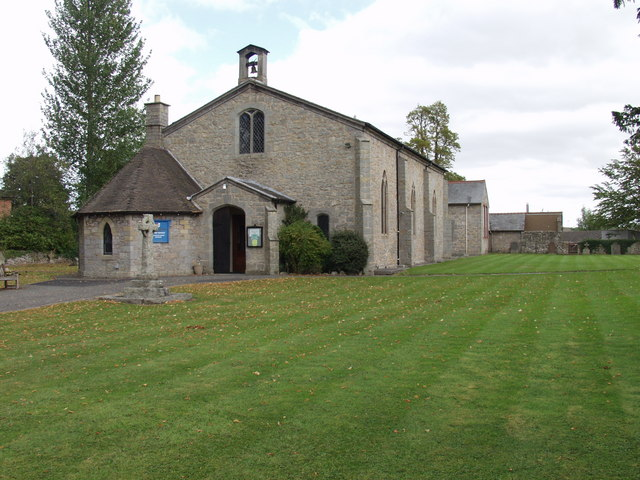
- All Saints Parish Church, Trefonen

- Location within Shropshire
- OS grid reference: SJ259268
- Civil parish: Oswestry Rural
- Unitary authority: Shropshire
- Ceremonial county: Shropshire
- Region: West Midlands
- Country: England
- Sovereign state: United Kingdom
- Post town: OSWESTRY
- Postcode district: SY10
- Dialling code: 01691
- Police: West Mercia
- Fire: Shropshire
- Ambulance: West Midlands
- UK Parliament: North Shropshire

Trefonen /trɪˈvɒnɪn/ is a small village located approximately three miles (4.8 km) south-west of Oswestry, and three miles east of the England-Wales border, in Shropshire, England. The name translates into "village of the ash trees" in English. In 2001, the total population was 1,798, but there has been considerable housing development since that time. The village currently comprises over 700 households, a village hall with playing fields and play area, a parish church, one public house—the Barley Mow, one shop, pre school, and a primary school. At the 2011 Census the population details are listed under Oswestry Rural.

The eighth century earthwork Offa's Dyke ran through the village and it is still visible today, in small sections, running adjacent to Chapel Lane. The Offa's Dyke Path, tracing the route of the structure, also runs directly through the village. Each summer the more contemporary Trefonen Hill Walk is organised by local residents to raise money for charitable causes.

== History ==
Although not mentioned in the Domesday Book, records from 1272 show Trefonen as having an obligation to keep the lord's hounds . However, the village owes most of its current size to mining activity from the early 18th century until the last mine closed in 1891. During this period the resident populace became engaged in the extraction of the underlying coal, the quarrying of surface carboniferous limestone and its subsequent manufacturing use in a local pottery and brickworks. As these industries declined in the latter half of the 19th century local people returned to their agricultural roots and sheep and cattle rearing flourished.

Many of the village's local facilities were built to service the expanding working population of the 18th and 19th centuries and so the Malthouse was built in 1720, the Barley Mow public house in 1760, the Calvinistic Methodist Chapel in 1795, the All Saints Anglican parish church in 1821, the school house in 1825, and the Carneddau Independent Chapel in 1832. The village hall is the latest addition and was completed in 1991.

There is also now a brewery in the village which makes Offa's Brew. This is located next door to the Barley Mow, and first opened in 2006.

== Hill Walk Weekend ==
Trefonen has hosted a yearly weekend of hill walking and events since 1988. There are several long walks over the course of the long bank holiday weekend, the longest being 16 miles (26 km) around the local countryside. Permission is kindly granted from local farmers to use their fields for the charitable purposes. Other regular events include shorter walks aimed at families and children, cross country fun runs, and horse riding. The weekend has grown over recent years to also include a scarecrow competition and a duck race, as well as entertainment nights at the local village hall. Money raised is shared between a local charity, and a foreign charity, typically a school or children's project in an African country.

== Notable people ==
- Maurice Parry, Welsh international footballer
- Sam Meredith, former Welsh footballer
- Di Jones, former Welsh footballer
- Joe Clarke England cricketer

== Football Team ==
In 2008 the village set up a football team called Trefonen F.C., who play in the Welsh league system.
