= St. Winifred's Well =

St. Winifred's Well may refer to:

- St. Winifred's Well, Dublin, Ireland
- St Winifred's Well, Woolston, England
- St Winefride's Well, Holywell, Wales
