= Saint Winifred =

Welsh Christian martyr

Saint Winifred or Winefride
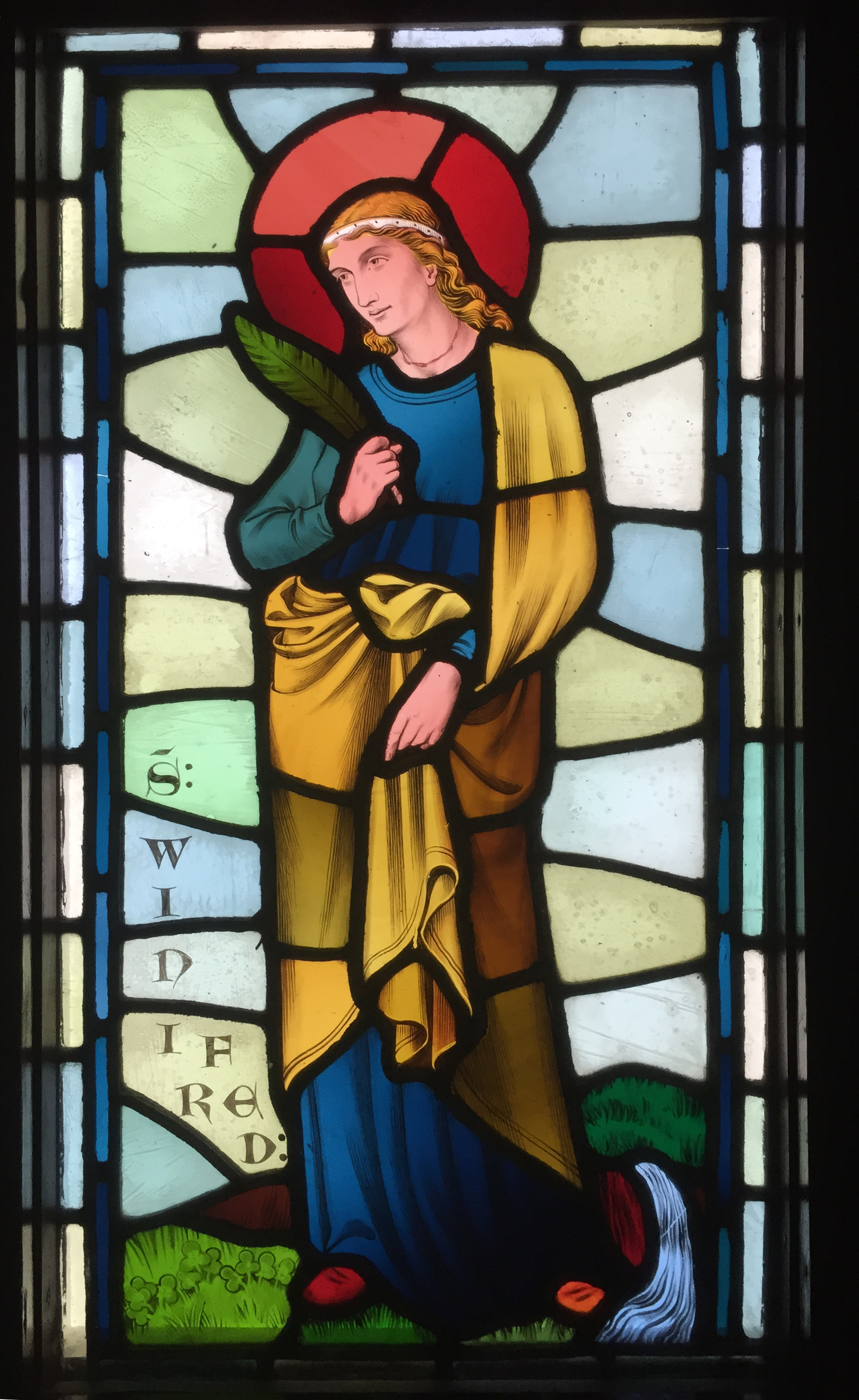
- Stained glass depiction of Winifred, designed by William Burges, at Castell Coch, Cardiff

Virgin and martyr
- Born: Tegeingl (modern-day Flintshire)
- Died: c. 7th century Gwytherin (in modern-day Conwy)
- Venerated in: Anglican Communion; Eastern Orthodox Church; Roman Catholic Church
- Major shrine: Shrewsbury Abbey, now destroyed although a small part of the shrine base survives. Holywell, fully active holy well and well-house shrine.
- Feast: 3 November
- Attributes: Abbess, holding a sword, sometimes with her head under her arm
- Patronage: Holywell; against unwanted advances, Diocese of Shrewsbury

Saint Winifred (or Winefride; Welsh: Gwenffrewi; Latin: Wenefreda, Winifreda) was a Welsh virgin martyr of the 7th century. Her story was celebrated as early as the 8th century, but became popular in England in the 12th, when her hagiography was first written down.

A healing spring at the traditional site of her decapitation and restoration is now a shrine and pilgrimage site called St Winefride's Well in Holywell, Flintshire, in Wales and known as "the Lourdes of Wales", which was granted the status of National Shrine for England and Wales in November 2023.

== Life and legend ==
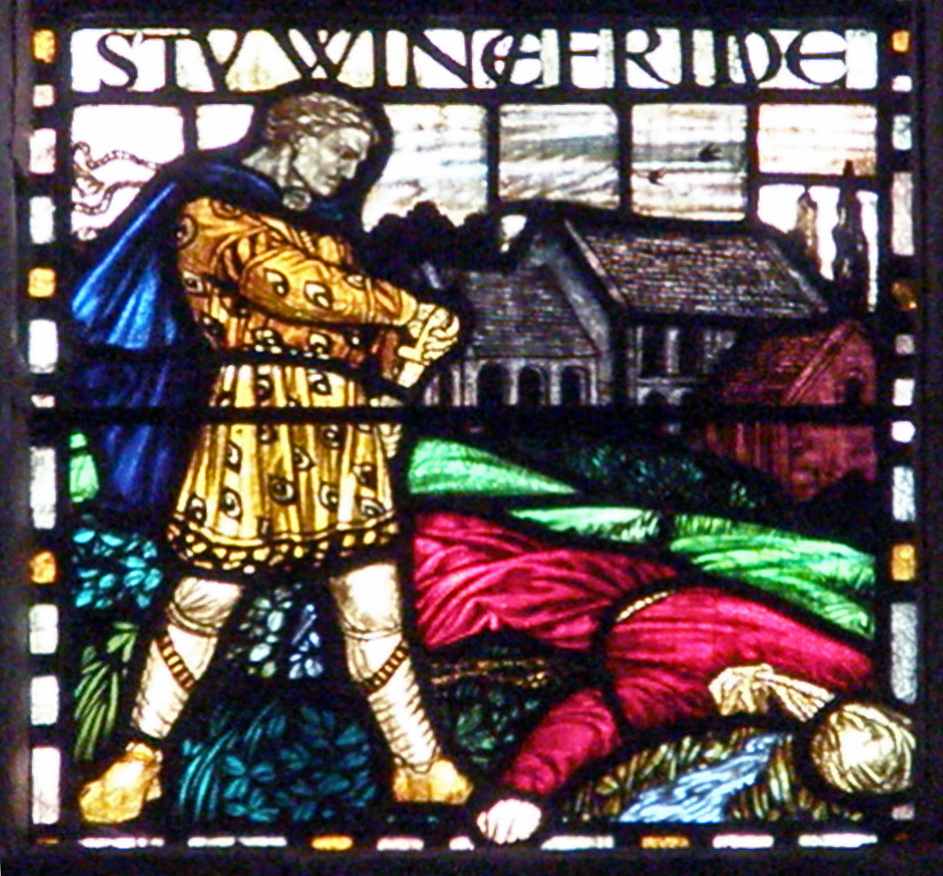
Stained glass window depicting the martyrdom of Winefride (by Margaret Agnes Rope, west window, Shrewsbury Cathedral, 1910)

The oldest accounts of Winifred's life date to the 12th century. According to legend, Winifred was the daughter of a chieftain of Tegeingl, Welsh nobleman Tyfid ap Eiludd. Her mother was Wenlo, a niece of Saint Beuno, and a member of a family closely connected with the kings of south Wales.

According to legend, her suitor, Caradog, was enraged when she decided to become a nun and when she refused his advances, he decapitated her. A healing spring appeared where her head fell. Winifred's head was subsequently rejoined to her body due to the efforts of Beuno, and she was restored to life. Seeing the murderer leaning on his sword with an insolent and defiant air, Beuno invoked the chastisement of heaven, and Caradog fell dead on the spot, the popular belief being that the ground opened and swallowed him. Beuno left Holywell, and returned to Caernarfon; before he left, the tradition is that he seated himself upon a stone, which now stands in the outer well pool, and there promised in the name of God "that whosoever on that spot should thrice ask for a benefit from God in the name of St. Winefride would obtain the grace he asked if it was for the good of his soul."

After eight years spent at Holywell, Winifred received an inspiration to leave the convent and retire inland. Accordingly, Winifred went upon her pilgrimage to seek a place of rest. Ultimately she arrived at Gwytherin near the source of the River Elwy. She later became a nun and abbess at Gwytherin in Conwy County Borough. More elaborate versions of this tale relate many details of her life, including Winefride's pilgrimage to Rome.

Given the late date of the earliest surviving written accounts of Winifred's life, her existence has been doubted since the 19th century. She is not recorded in any Welsh pedigree of saints nor in the 13th-century calendar of Welsh saints. There is, however, evidence of her cult from centuries before the appearance of her first hagiography. Two small pieces of an oak reliquary from the 8th century were discovered in 1991 and identified based on earlier drawings as belonging to the Arch Gwenfrewi, the reliquary of Winifred. The reliquary probably contained an article of clothing or another object associated with the saint, but not her bones. According to historian Lynne Heidi Stumpe, the reliquary provides "good evidence for her having been recognized as a saint very soon after her death", and thus of her historicity. The reliquary may even be "the earliest surviving testimony to the formal cultus of any Welsh saint".

== Veneration ==
Veneration of Winifred as a martyr saint is attested from the 12th century. She is mostly venerated in England, not in Wales, which led Caesar Baronius to list her as an "English saint" in his Roman Martyrology of 1584.

In 1138, relics of Winifred were carried to Shrewsbury to form the basis of an elaborate shrine.

=== Cult ===
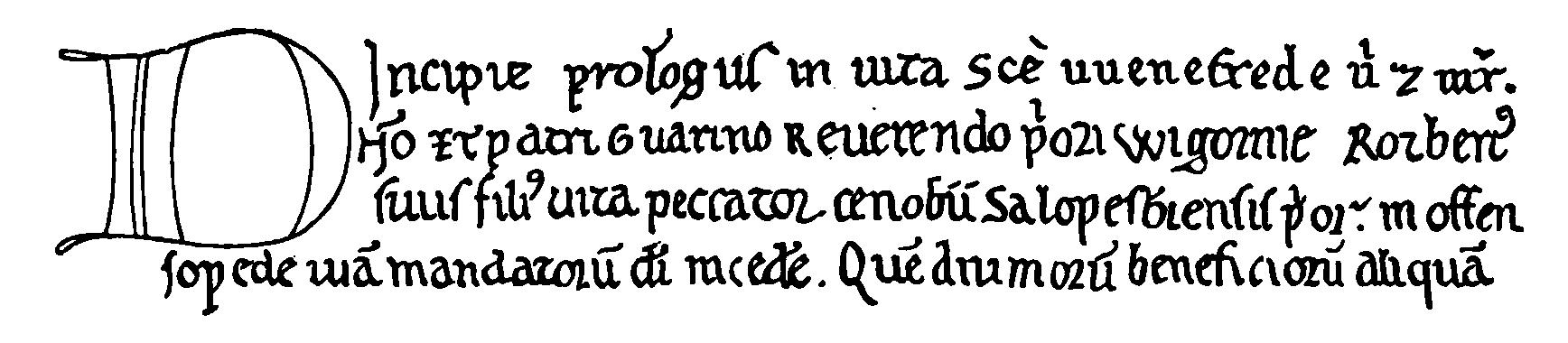
Part of the prologue of a life of St Winifred by Robert of Shrewsbury (Bodleian Mss. Laud c.94.)

The details of Winifred's life are gathered from a manuscript in the British Museum, said to have been the work of the British monk, Elerius, a contemporary of the saint, and also from a manuscript life in the Bodleian Library, generally believed to have been compiled in 1130 by Robert, prior of Shrewsbury (d. 1168). Prior Robert is generally credited with greatly promoting the cult of St. Winifred by translating her relics from Gwytherin to Shrewsbury Abbey and writing the most influential life of the saint. The chronicler John of Tynemouth also wrote of Winifred.

To further enhance the prestige of the Abbey, Abbot Nicholas Stevens built a new shrine for St. Winifred in the 14th century, before then having some monks steal the relics of St. Beuno from Rhewl and installed in the abbey church. Although the abbey was fined, it was allowed to keep the relics.

William Caxton's 1483 edition of the Golden Legend includes the story of St. Winifred. The following year, he printed a separate "Life" of the saint.

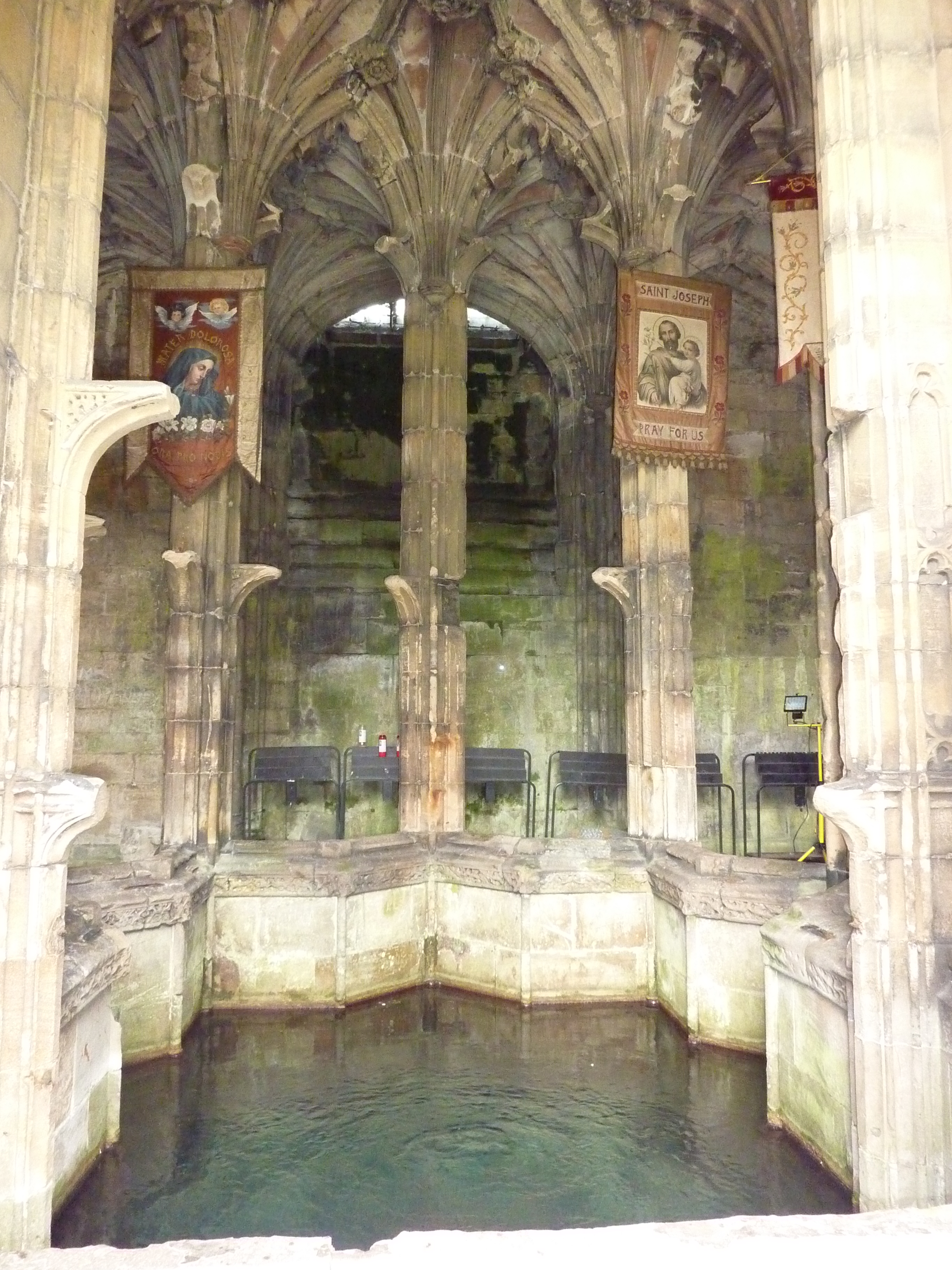
St Winefride's Well in Holywell, one of the oldest continually visited pilgrimage sites in Britain

The shrine and well at Shrewsbury became major pilgrimage goals in the Late Middle Ages, but the shrine was destroyed by Henry VIII in 1540.

St Winefride's Well in Flintshire, originally formed from a mountain spring, is housed below the town on the side of a steep hill. The well precinct also houses an 'Interpretive Exhibition', setting forth the story of the saint and her shrine in detail; the Victorian former custodians' house has also been converted to house a museum of the pilgrimage. The site is managed by Cadw and the Roman Catholic Diocese of Wrexham.

St Winefride's Holy Well at Holywell Farm in Cheshire is one of a number of holy wells dedicated to St Winefride, placed to mark the supposed route of her remains when they were taken from Holywell in Clwyd, where she was martyred, to Shrewsbury Abbey. It is a scheduled monument.

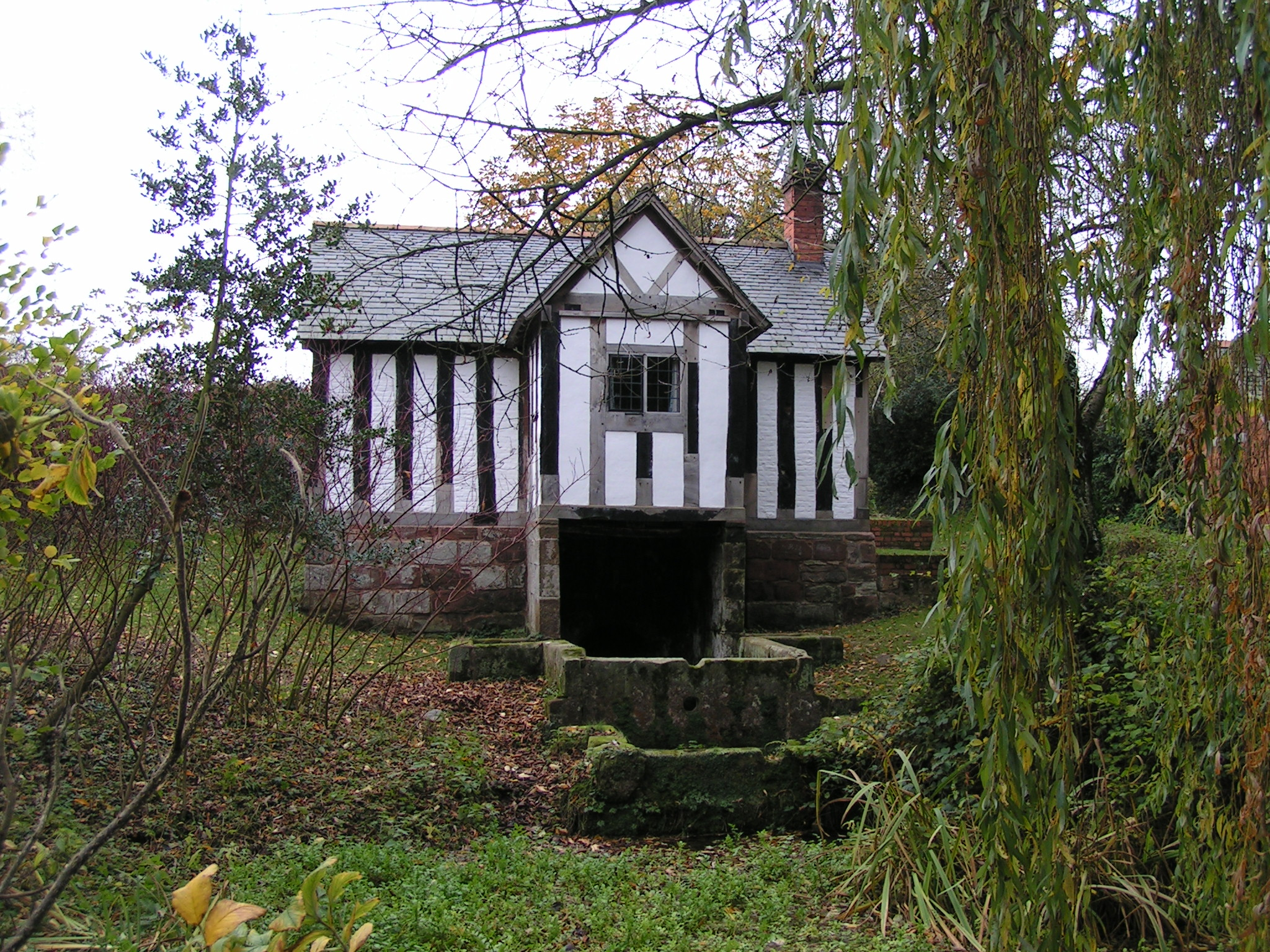
St Winifred's Well, a 14th-century former well chapel, Woolston, Shropshire

Another well named after St. Winifred is found in the hamlet of Woolston near Oswestry in Shropshire. According to legend, it is thought that on her way to Shrewsbury Abbey, Winifred's body was laid there overnight and a spring sprang up out of the ground. The well is covered by a 15th-century half-timbered cottage. The water flows through a series of stone troughs and into a large pond, which then flows into a stream. The cottage is maintained by the Landmark Trust.

A spring on Lansdown Hill, Bath, was known as St. Winifred's Spring and gave its name to nearby Winifreds Lane. There appears to be no known connection to the life of the saint, but its waters were once supposed to help women conceive.

A Norman church of Saint Winifred's can be found in the village of Branscombe, Devon. There is some archaeological evidence to suggest an earlier Saxon church may have occupied the site. The 12th-century parish church in the village of Stainton, South Yorkshire, England, is also dedicated to her.

St. Winifred's Well, Dublin, was built c. 1700 on Eustace Street. It is presumed to be linked to the presence of Welsh and English merchants in the city.

=== Roman Martyrology ===
In the 2004 edition of the Roman Martyrology, Winifred is listed under 2 November with the Latin name Winefrídae: "At the spring located at Holywell in Wales, St Winefride the Virgin, who is outstanding in her witness as a nun". Winifred is officially recognised by the Vatican as a person with a historical basis, who lived an exemplary religious life, but with no discussion of miracles which she may have performed or been healed by. As a 1st-millennium saint, she is recognised as a saint by popular acclaim, rather than ever being formally canonized.

In the liturgical calendar of the Roman Catholic Church for Wales, Winifred is commemorated on 3 November, since 2 November is designated as All Souls' Day.

=== Iconography ===
Winifred's representation in stained glass at Llandyrnog and Llanasa focuses on her learning and her status as an honorary martyr, but the third aspect of her life, her religious leadership, is also commemorated visually. On the seal of the cathedral chapter of St. Asaph (now in the National Museums and Galleries of Wales, Cathays Park, Cardiff), she appears wimpled as an abbess, bearing a crozier, symbol of leadership and authority and a reliquary.

=== Feast days ===
- 22 (24) June – death anniversary,
- 30 October – feast day in Ireland
- 2 November – Roman Martyrology
- 3 November – feast day in England and Wales

== References in fiction ==
St. Winifred's Well, termed "þe Holy Hede", is mentioned in the medieval poem Sir Gawain and the Green Knight (in Passus II). She also appears as a character in the 2021 film adaptation of the poem, portrayed by actress Erin Kellyman.

William Rowley's 17th-century comedy A Shoemaker a Gentleman dramatises St. Winifred's story, based on the version in Thomas Deloney's story The Gentle Craft (1584).

English poet Gerard Manley Hopkins memorialised St. Winifred in his unfinished drama, St Winifred's Well.

The moving of Winifred's bones to Shrewsbury is fictionalised in A Morbid Taste for Bones, the first of Ellis Peters' Brother Cadfael novels, with the plot twist that her bones are secretly left in Wales, and someone else is put into the shrine; St. Winifred is portrayed as an important character in all the books in the Brother Cadfael series. The celebration of her Feast Day provides the setting for two of the novels, The Rose Rent and The Pilgrim of Hate. The casket is stolen from its shrine in The Holy Thief, and the campaign to find and restore it propels the action. Throughout the series, the protagonist, Brother Cadfael – a Welsh monk at the English monastery at Shrewsbury – develops a "special understanding" with the saint, whom he affectionately calls "The Girl".

Australian novelist Gerald Murnane makes reference to St. Winifred in his novel Inland.

St. Winifred appears as a spirit to Sir Gawain in the 2021 movie The Green Knight. Winifred asks Sir Gawain to retrieve her severed head from a spring, which he does. He places the head in her bed with the rest of her skeletal remains, and she provides him with information regarding the identity of the Green Knight.

== Legacy ==
A bronze statue of St. Winifred by George Edwin Bissell stands on Promenade Hill overlooking the Hudson River in Hudson, New York. It was presented to the city in 1896 by John Watts de Peyster. The statue had originally been planned as a fountain for the Watts de Peyster Hospital and Invalid Children's Home at Madalin, operated by the Women's Board of Domestic Missions of the Methodist Church, but the board found it couldn't spare the water.

== See also ==
- Our Lady of Loreto and St Winefride's, Kew
- St. Winifred's Well, Dublin, Ireland
- St Winifred's Well, Woolston, England
