= Eustace Street =

Street in central Dublin, Ireland

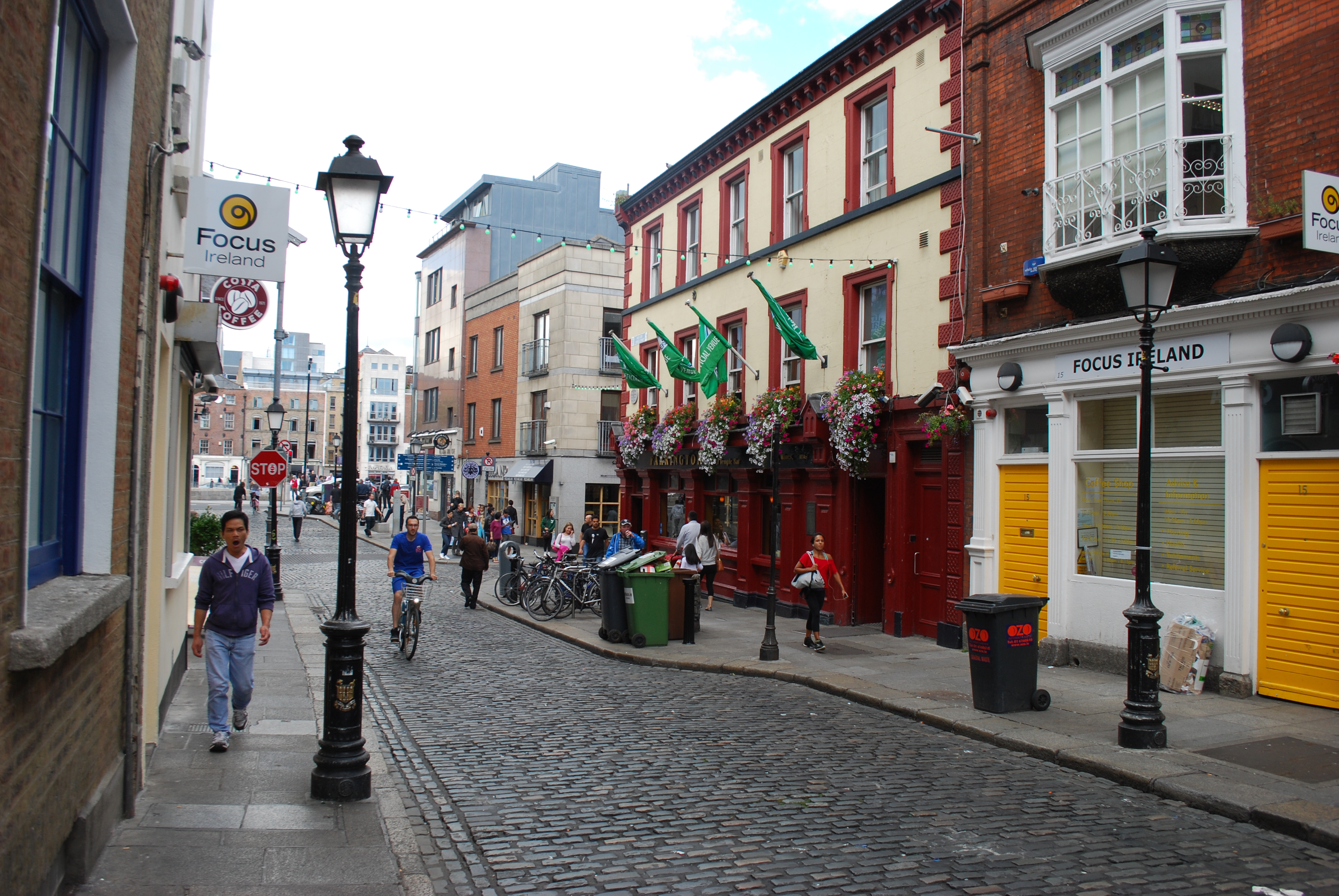

- Location within Central Dublin
- Native name: Sráid an Iústásaigh (Irish)
- Namesake: Sir Maurice Eustace
- Length: 170 m (560 ft)
- Width: 7 metres (23 ft)
- Location: Dublin, Ireland
- Postal code: D02
- Coordinates: 53.344975°N 6.264842°W
- north end: Wellington Quay
- south end: Dame Street

Construction
- Construction start: 1701

Other
- Known for: Georgian architecture, Irish Film Institute, Quaker history

Eustace Street /ˈjuːstəs/ (Irish: Sráid an Iústásaigh) is a street in the Temple Bar area of Dublin, Ireland.

== Location ==
Eustace Street runs from Wellington Quay (near Millennium Bridge) to Dame Street, with junctions with Essex Street East and Curved Street.

At the halfway point of the street there is a passageway to Meetinghouse Square.

== History ==
Eustace Street takes its name from Sir Maurice Eustace (c. 1590 – 1665), former Lord Chancellor of Ireland, whose townhouse "Damask" and its gardens once stood on the site. The street was laid out prior to 1701 but legal issues held up the initial construction. Charles Brooking's map of Dublin (1728) shows the street as fully built.

The street was the site of a historic holy well dedicated to Saint Winifred. The well was uncovered during renovations in the 1990s. Saint Winifred is a Welsh saint, and it is not known why this well was dedicated to her.

The street is known for its association with the Religious Society of Friends, or Quakers. In 1692, the Quakers in Dublin established a meeting house on Sycamore Alley, off Dame Street and later expanded onto Eustace Street.

Eustace Street also once housed a Presbyterian/Unitarian church, which moved there from New Row in 1728; John Leland was a pastor there.

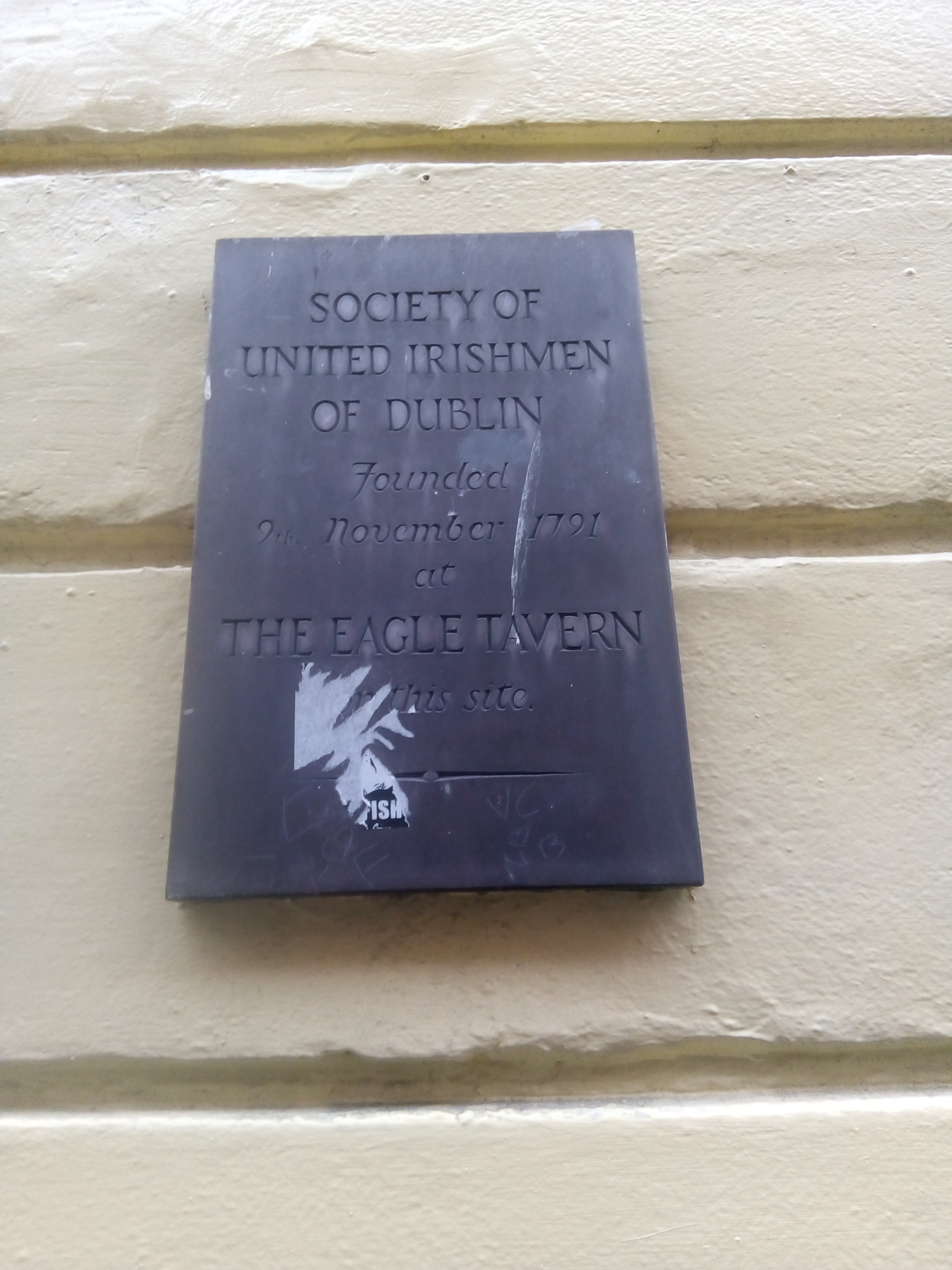
Plaque on the wall of the former Eagle Tavern

In the 18th century, Eustace Street was the site of the Eagle Tavern, which was the site of the founding of the Dublin Society of United Irishmen.

The Stamp and Imprest office was located at number 4 and 5 on the street from its establishment in 1775 until it moved to Powerscourt House in 1811.

=== 19th century ===
The street addresses were renumbered in the 1840s.

=== 20th century ===
In recent years the street has become a cultural centre, housing the Irish Film Institute and The Ark. Fishamble: The New Play Company are located at 1 Eustace Street.

== Cultural references ==
Eustace Street appears twice in the work of James Joyce:

Darkness, accompanied by a thick fog, was gaining upon the dusk of February and the lamps in Eustace Street had been lit.

— "Counterparts" (Dubliners)

Watch! Watch! Silk flash rich stockings white. Watch!
A heavy tramcar honking its gong slewed between.
Lost it. Curse your noisy pugnose. Feels locked out of it. Paradise and the peri. Always happening like that. The very moment. Girl in Eustace street hallway Monday was it settling her garter. Her friend covering the display of. Esprit de corps. Well, what are you gaping at?

— Ulysses

Irish band Delorentos released a single entitled "Eustace Street" in 2007.

== Gallery ==
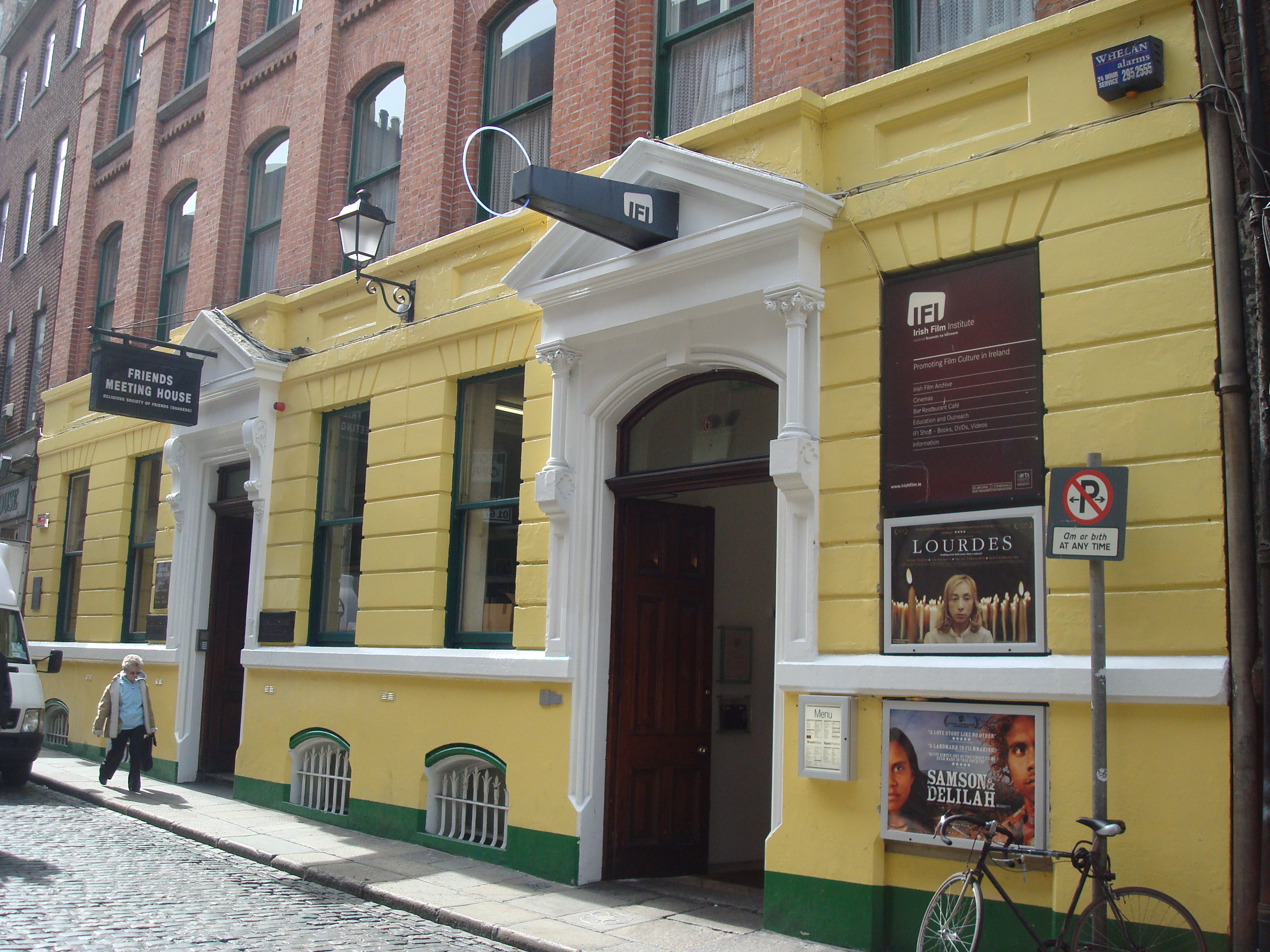
Irish Film Institute (6 Eustace St); sign visible for the Friends Meeting House (4–5 Eustace St) at left

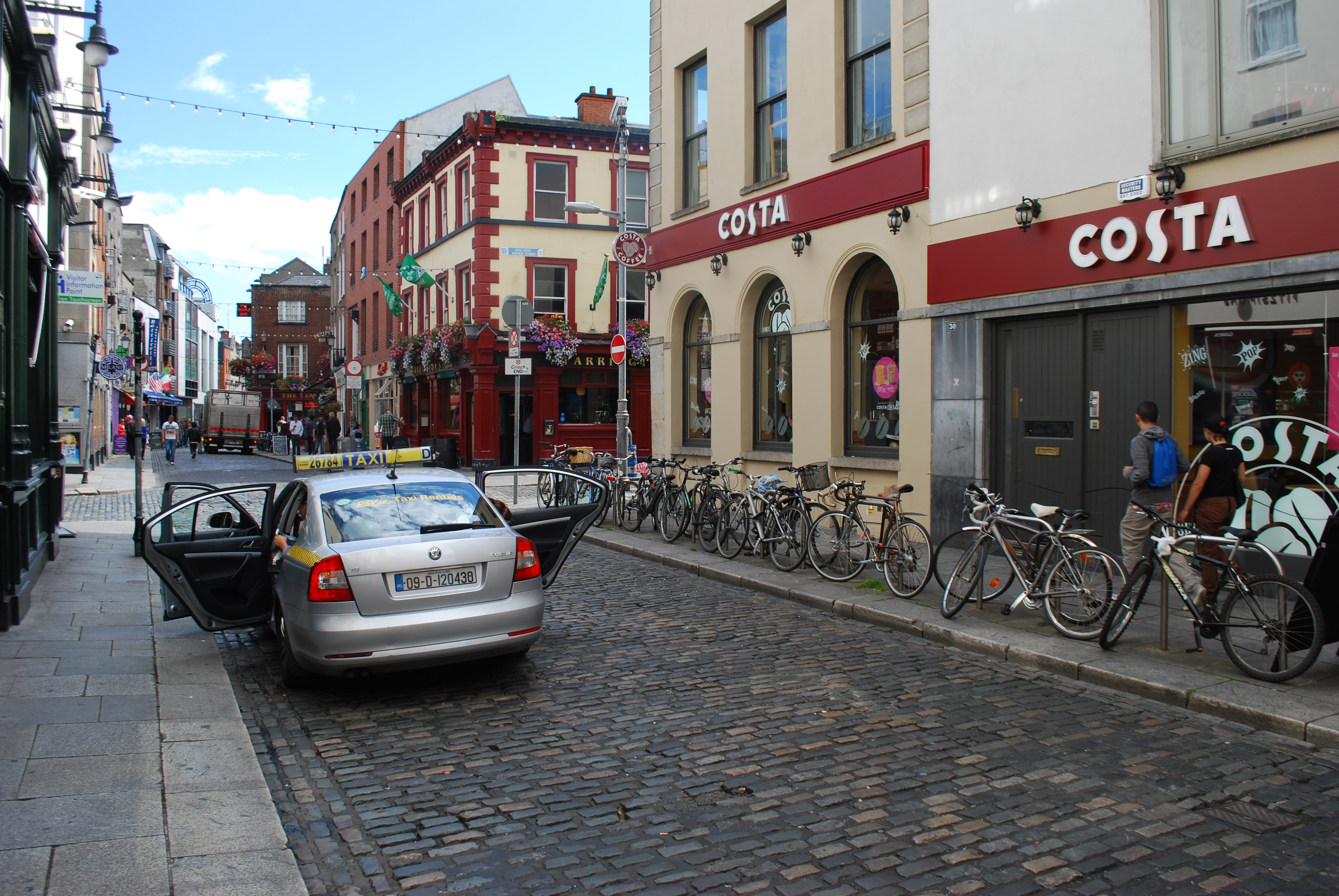
View facing east towards Temple Bar's main square

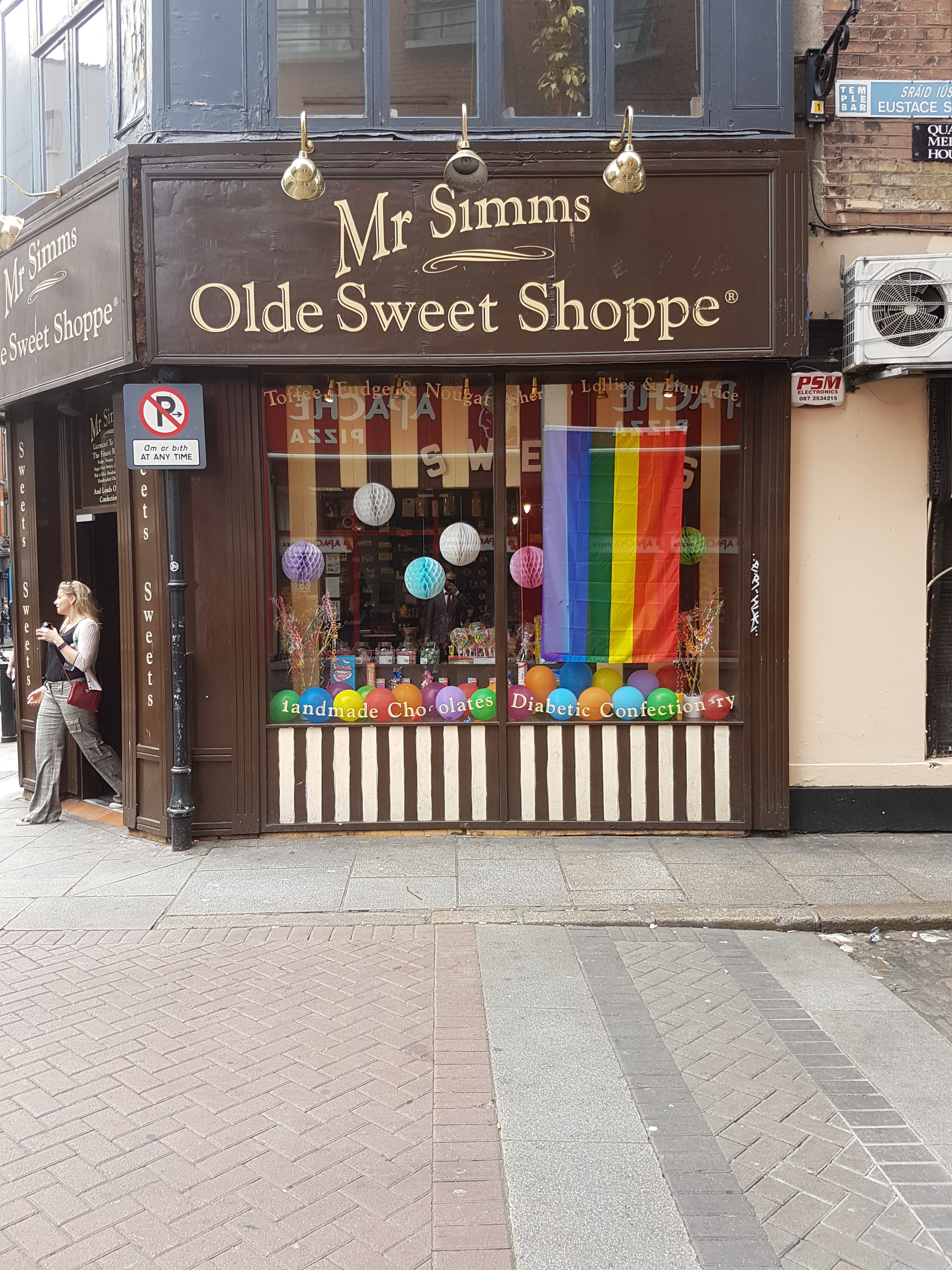
Mr. Simm's Olde Sweet Shoppe, located on the corner of Eustace Street and Dame Street

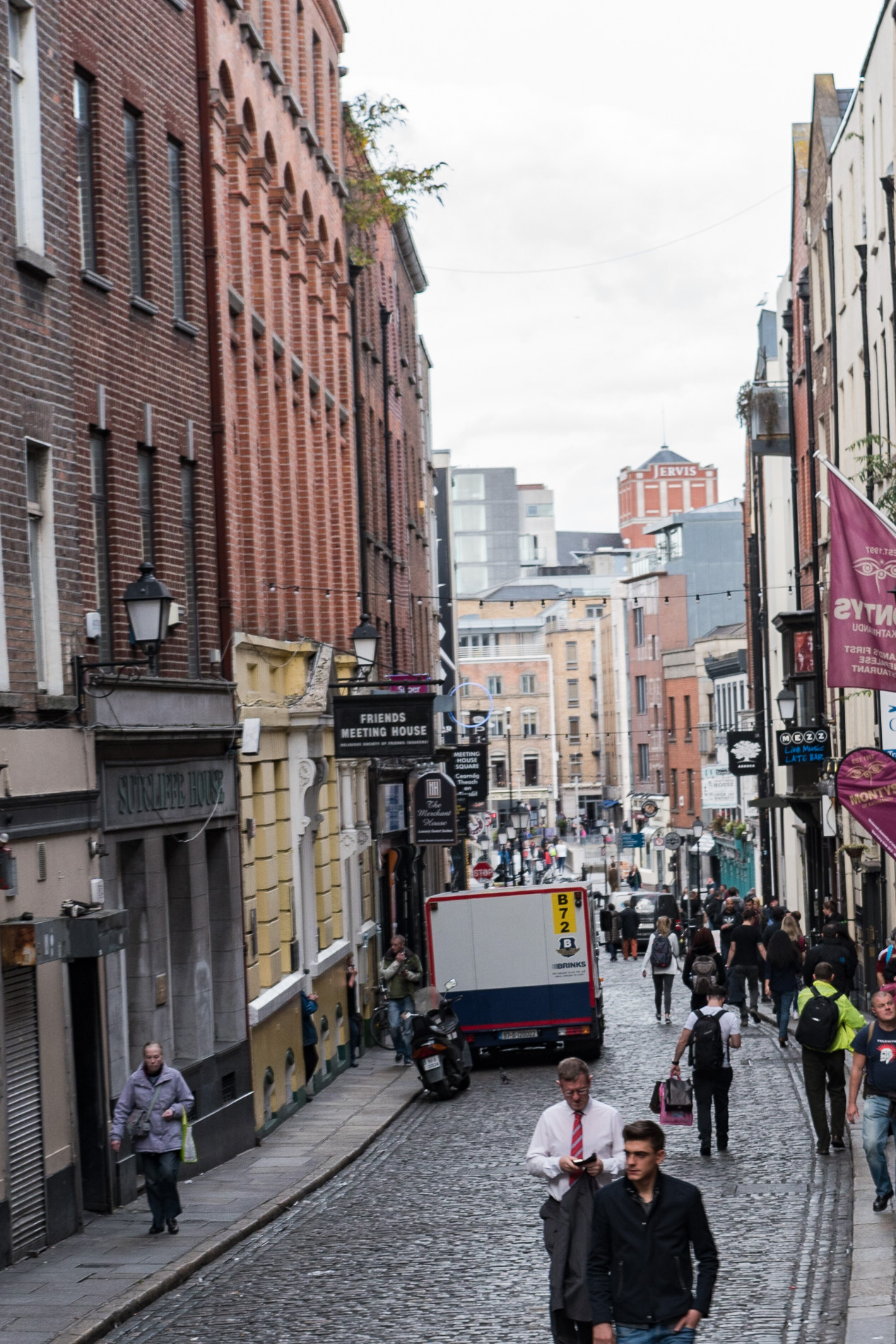
View facing north

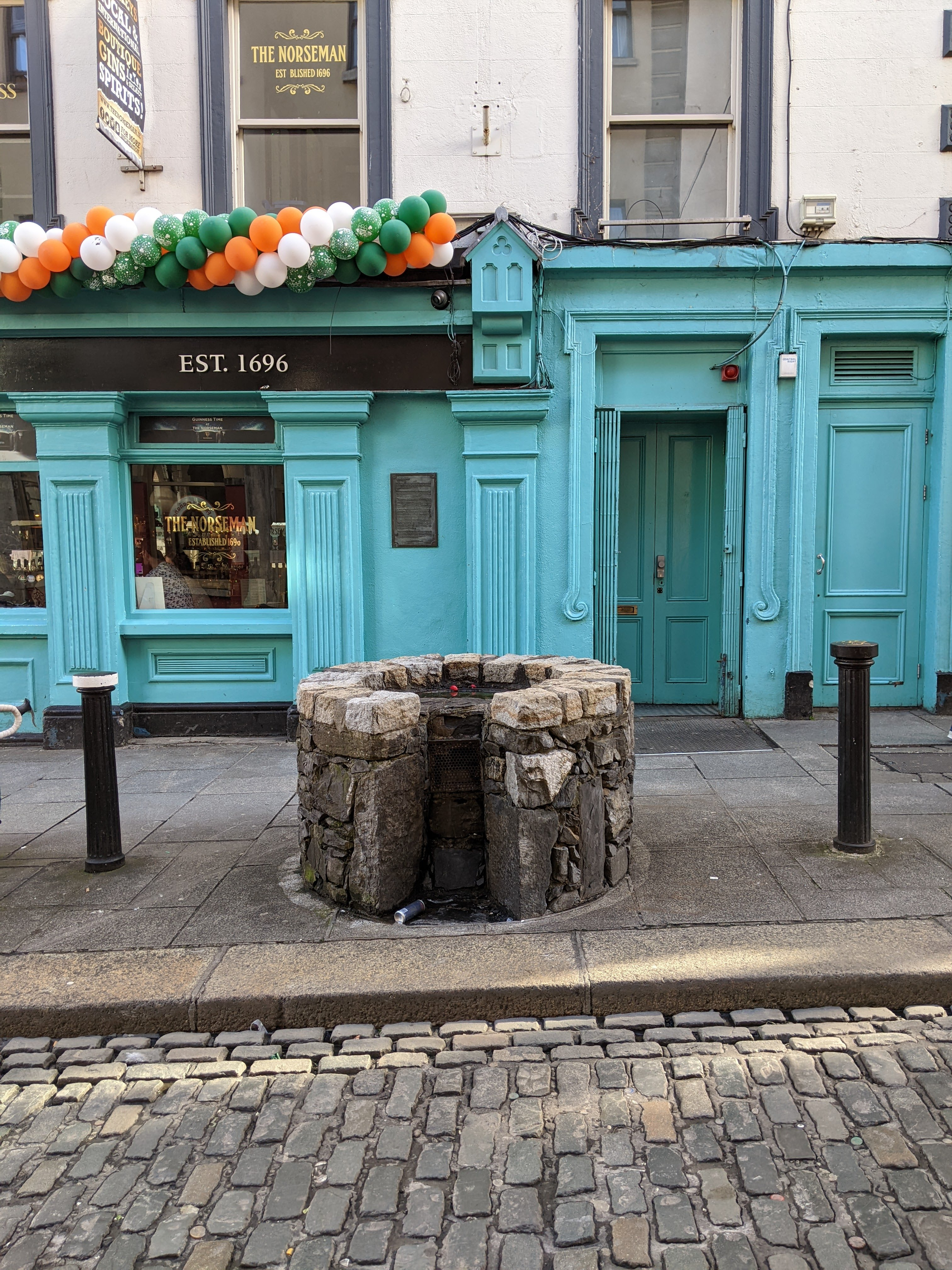
The remains of St Winifred's Well

== See also ==
- Quakers in Ireland
- List of streets and squares in Dublin
