= St Winifred's Well, Woolston =

Coordinates: 52°48′48″N 3°00′25″W

St Winifred's Well
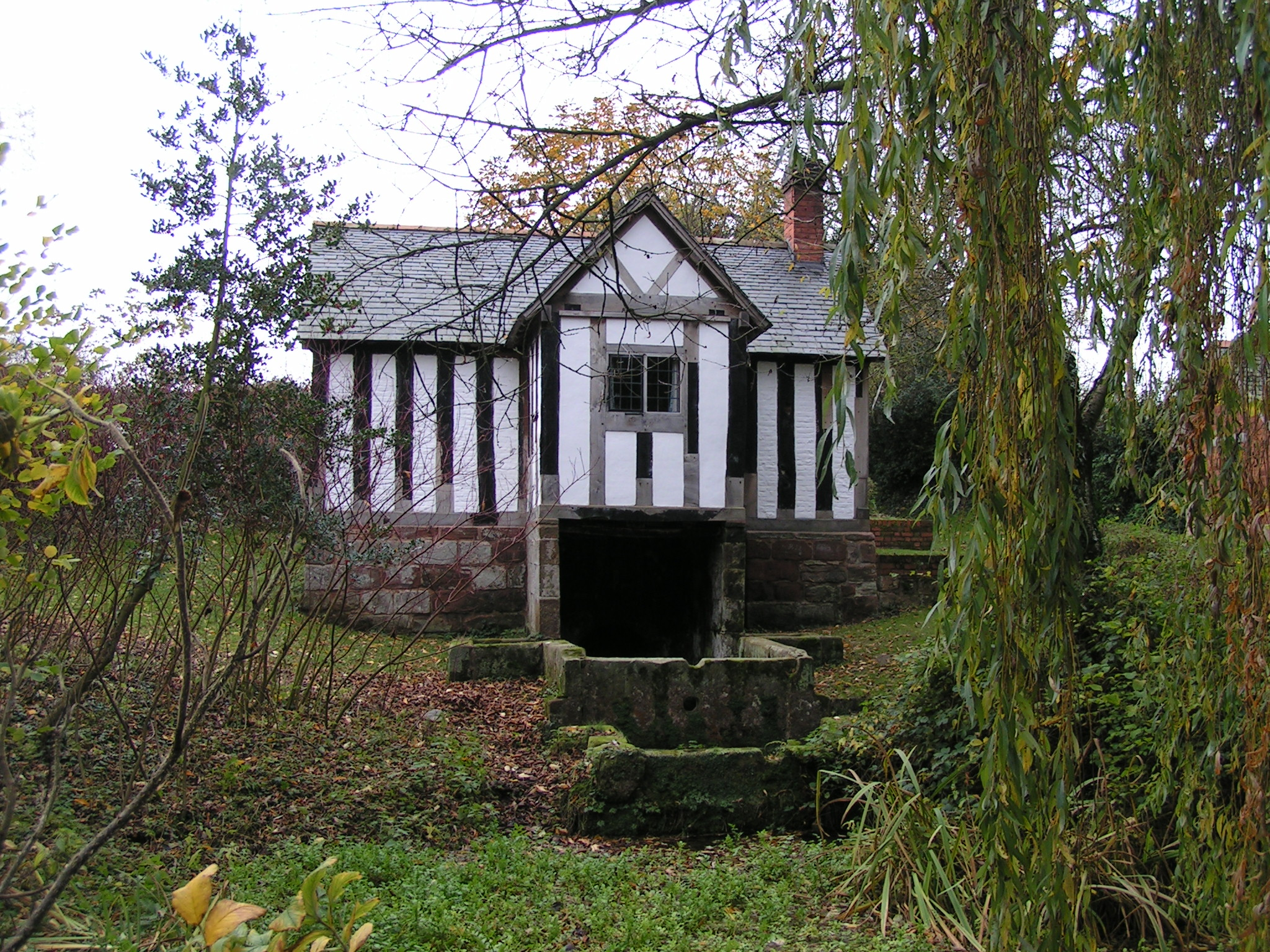
- Location: Woolston, Shropshire
- Built: 16th century
- Restored: 1990
- Restored by: Landmark Trust
- Owner: Landmark Trust

Listed Building – Grade II*
- Official name: St Winifred's Well
- Type: Grade II*
- Designated: 19 January 1952
- Reference no.: 1054245

St Winifred's Well, Woolston is a holy well and wellhouse located within the hamlet of Woolston, Shropshire. It has been a Grade II* listed building since 1952.

== Legend ==
According to local legend, a spring appeared on this spot when the body of St Winifred was rested here in 1138. Her relics were being transported from Gwytherin in Wales to Shrewsbury Abbey, and they were placed here whilst the monks who were transporting them rested.

In William Caxton's The Lyf of the Holy Blessid Vyrgyn Saynt Wenefryde, published in 1483, it is recorded that the monks decided to rest and wash the bones, and a spring of water gushed forth, about 10 miles from Shrewsbury. This is likely to be the earliest reference to the St Winifred's Well in Woolston.

The spring became well known by pilgrims for healing serious injuries, such as broken bones. In John Mirk's book Festial, he describes two miraculous events in which pilgrims were healed by "þe watyr þat Saynt Wenefryd bonys wer waschyn yn". Another spring, lower down, was said to be good for healing eyes.

Occasionally, pebbles covered in red spots that resemble blood stains are found in the water; pilgrims attributed the "bloodstains" to the story of St Winifred's decapitation. In truth, the red stains are caused by a certain type of algae that grows in the well. William Caxton describes this phenomenon in his book: "the stones that lie and rest in that water been besprint as it were with drops of blood".

== History ==
St Winifred's Well has been a pilgrimage destination since at least the 12th century. The building of the current structure, in the early 16th century, was funded by Lady Margaret Beaufort, who also rebuilt St Winefride's Well in Holywell.

The well's dedication to St Winifred was first recorded in 1837, but, almost definitely, this reflects a much older oral tradition.

=== Early history ===
The timber-framed building that sits above part of the well has been dated by dendrochronology to 1485. For many years, the building's origins have been disputed.

In 1886, a local historian named Adolphus Dovaston argued that the building above the well had been built as a court house, and that the building's medieval trusses had been taken from St Michael's Church, West Felton.

However, a Survey of the Lordship of Oswestry from 1602 describes the building as "Woolston Chapel", and the Landmark Trust say that this makes it almost certain that the structure originated as a religious building. When the Trust began to restore the wellhouse in 1990, they found evidence that the building had been built for ecclesiastical purposes:

The presence of an original doorway with decorated lintel at the west end as the public entrance, and another door in the south wall for a priest (slightly to the east of the existing doorway), reveal this as having been built a distinctively ecclesiastical building, not as a dwelling. Framing details at the east end (today’s bedroom area) also indicated the existence of a retable, or altar back.

— Charlotte Haslam, St Winifred's Well History Album

The Landmark Trust disagree that the building's medieval trusses have been re-used from West Felton's church: they said, during restoration, that "it became clear that the two main trusses, with their cusped struts, were not reused from somewhere else. They fitted their position and the rest of the timber frame very happily."

=== Post-Reformation ===
The Landmark Trust's survey of the building revealed that, early on in its history, the wellhouse had suffered a period of neglect; this may have been due to the Reformation, during which shrines such as St Winifred's were outlawed. However, the discovery of 16th century graffiti inside the wellhouse indicates that the well continued to be venerated despite the crackdowns.

During the 17th century, the well became a public bathing place. There were several ale houses nearby, which likely contributed to unruly and chaotic gatherings at the well; this possibly annoyed local landowners, causing them to suppress the use of the well by the public in about 1755.

At some point during the 17th century, the building above the well became a court house, before being converted into a simple cottage in 1824. It came into the ownership of the Landmark Trust in 1987, who rent the building out for holidays.

== Gallery ==
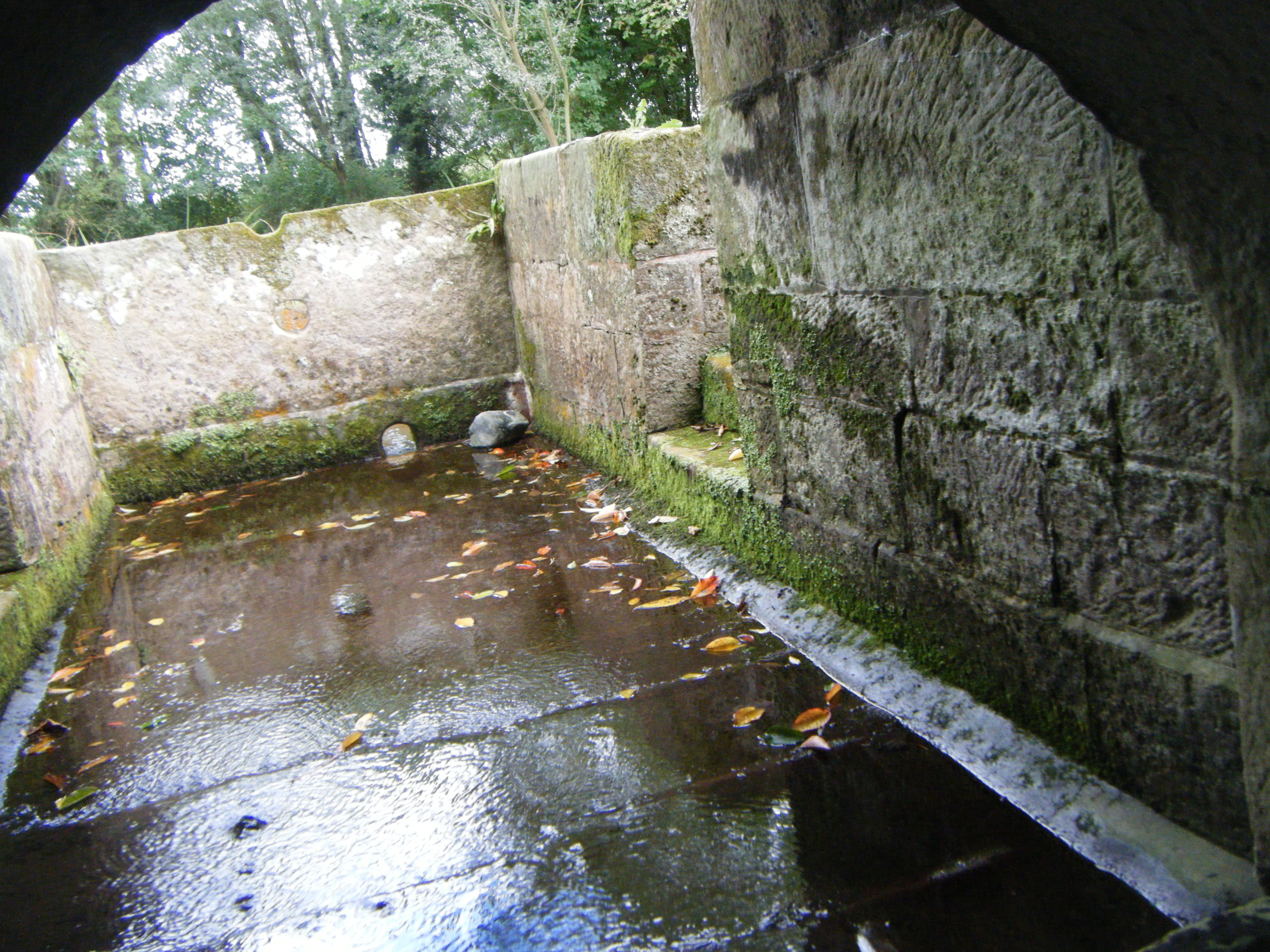
The main bathing pool, viewed from under the wellhouse

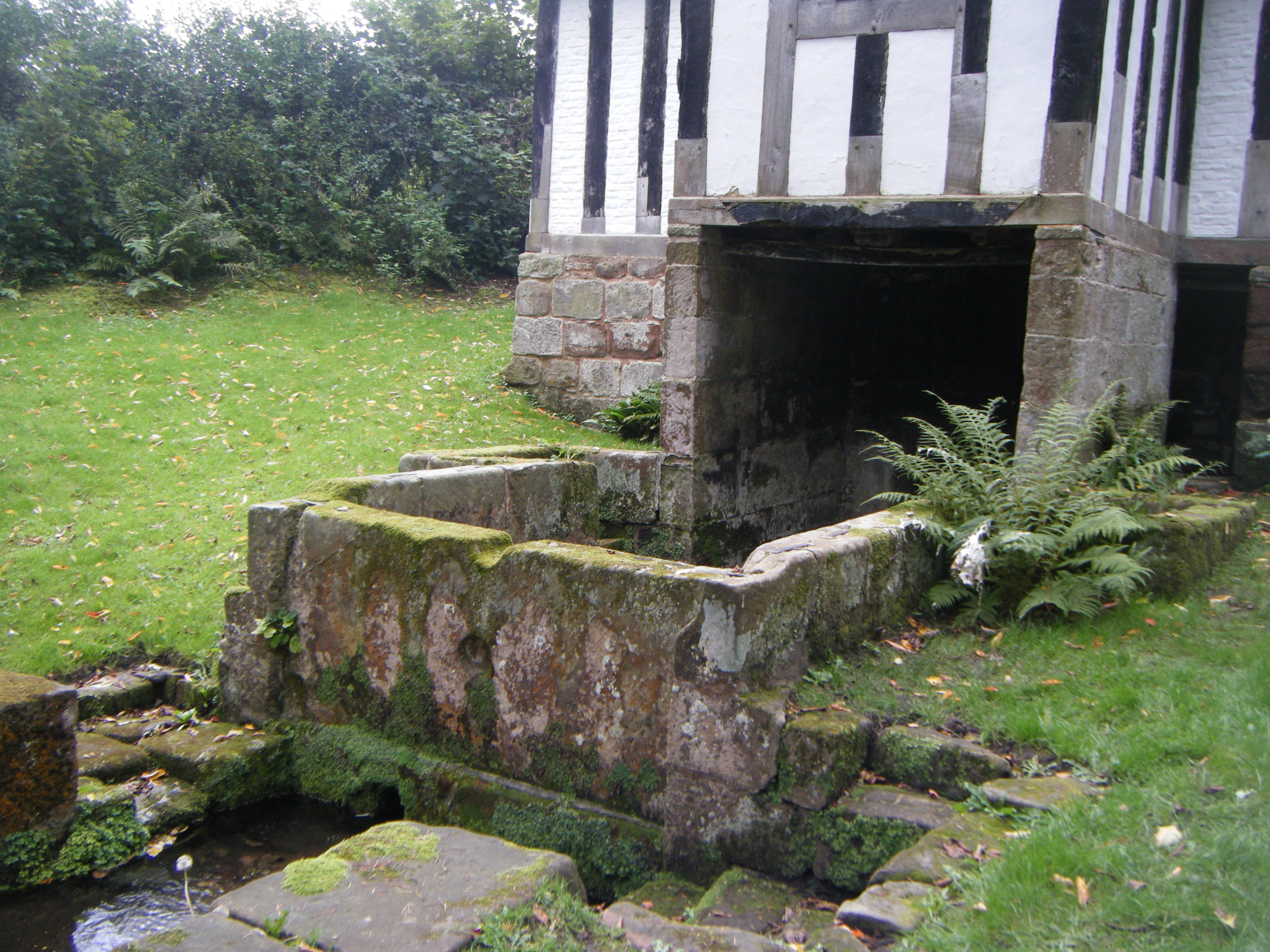
The three bathing pools

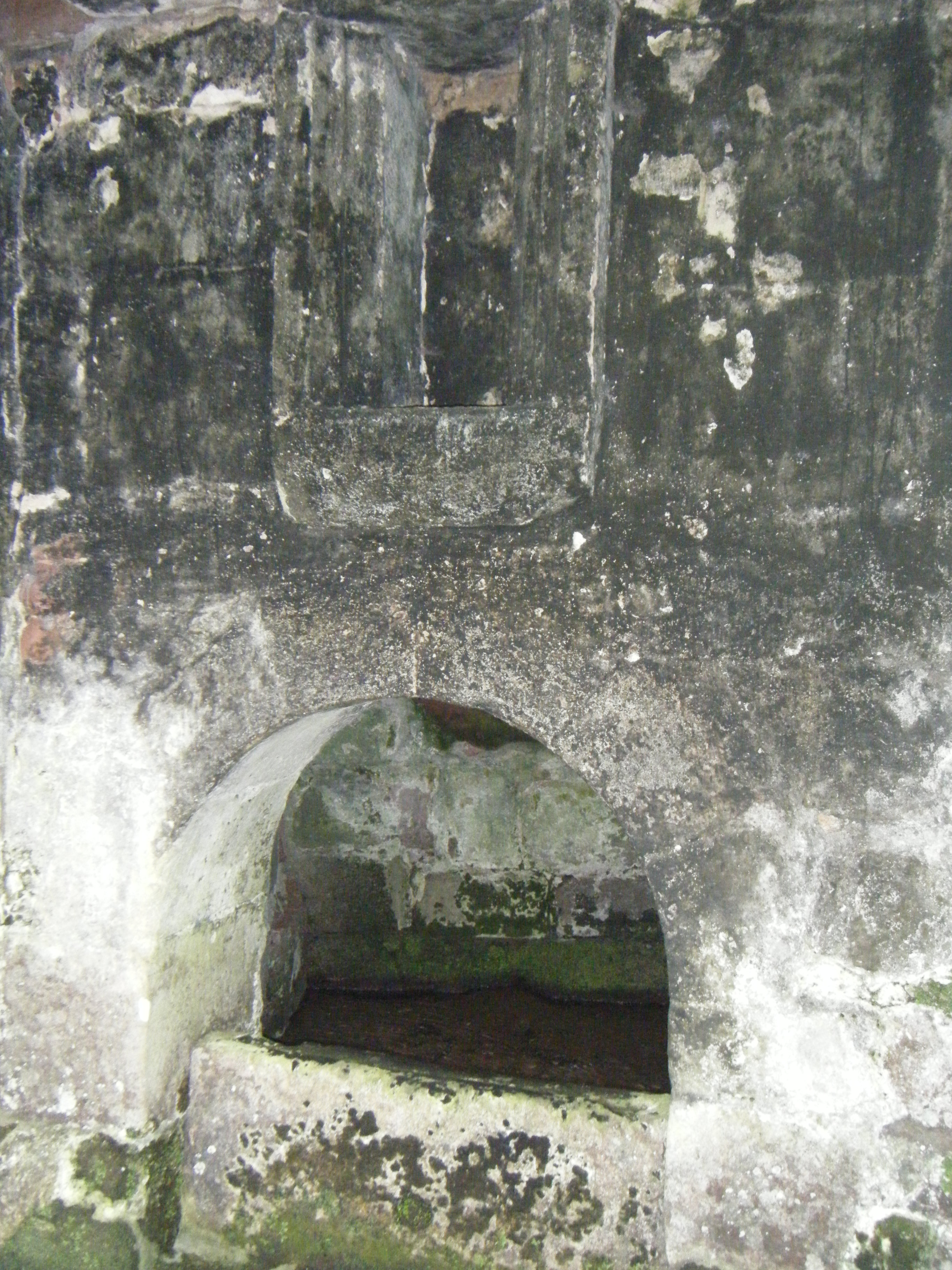
A niche for a statue, above the well
