= Quakers in Ireland =

Religious Society of Friends
- Classification: Christian
- Orientation: Quakers
- Polity: Congregationalist polity
- Leader: Changes Annually
- Associations: Friends World Committee for Consultation, Irish Council of Churches
- Region: Ireland
- Founder: William Edmundson
- Origin: 1654; Lurgan, County Armagh
- Separated from: Britain Yearly Meeting
- Congregations: 28
- Members: 1600
- Aid organization: Irish Quaker Faith in Action (IQFA), Christian Aid
- Hospitals: 1
- Nursing homes: 1
- Primary schools: 3
- Secondary schools: 3
- Official website: quakers-in-ireland.ie

The Religious Society of Friends (Quakers) have a long history in Ireland; their first recorded Meeting for Worship in Ireland was in 1654, at the home of William Edmundson, in Lurgan.

Quakers were known for entrepreneurship, setting up many businesses in Ireland, with many families such as the Goodbodys, Bewley's, Pims, Lambs, Jacobs, Edmundsons, Perrys, and Bells involved in milling, textiles, shipping, imports and exports, food and tobacco production, brewing, iron production and railway industries. William Penn, the founder of Pennsylvania, converted to Quakerism while dealing with his father's estates in Ireland. He attended meetings in Cork. In the 1650s and 1660s Quakers were treated with some severity by the authorities, especially in Cork.

The Quakers founded the town of Mountmellick, County Laois, in 1657, led by William Edmundson. There is a Quaker burial ground in Rosenallis, Co, Laois. Ballitore in County Kildare was planned as a Quaker town, Abraham Shackleton (ancestor of the polar explorer Ernest Shackleton) founded a school there in 1726. Quakers from all over Ireland attended, as did many non-Quakers. Among the famous non-Quakers to go there were Henry Grattan, Cardinal Paul Cullen, James Napper Tandy, and Edmund Burke.

In 1692, the Quakers opened a meeting house in Sycamore Alley, off Dame Street in Dublin. These premises expanded with the purchase of property backing onto Eustace Street. The Quakers building on Eustace Street, purchased in 1817, is the former Eagle Tavern, it is where the Dublin Society of the United Irishmen was formed in 1791. In 1988 they sold some of their property on Eustace Street, which became the Irish Film Institute.

The Cork Street Fever Hospital, Dublin was founded by Quakers in the early 19th century. The Royal Hospital, Donnybrook in Dublin, was also originally a Quaker hospital. There was a Quaker graveyard in Cork Street, and one in York Street off St. Stephen's Green, which was sold for the building of the Royal College of Surgeons.

The Quakers were known for setting up relief measures in their localities during the Great Famine. The Quaker Society of Friends was influential in providing direct relief to those effected by the Famine. Quakers became involved primarily in Irish philanthropy at the end of 1846, becoming one of the most influential philanthropic groups to initiate alms-giving. In less than a year, the Quakers raised and distributed around 200,000 pounds across mostly the South and West of Ireland. By the end of 1847, the Society of Friends began to move away from direct aid, instead focusing on aiding the development of Ireland into a modern economy.

Quakers' numbers declined due in some part due to individuals being "read out of meeting", where a member was disowned if they married a non-Quaker - this is no longer practised.

The Society was one of the six religious denominations recognized by article 44.1.3 of the Irish Constitution, which was adopted by popular plebiscite in 1937. This reference was deleted from the constitution via the Fifth Amendment of the Constitution of Ireland in 1972 along with that of the other recognized denominations and the "special position" of the Roman Catholic Church in Ireland.

== Quakers in Ireland today ==
Quakers claim to have circa 1,600 members on the island of Ireland. According to the Republic's 2016 Census, there were 848 members of the Society of Friends living in Ireland.

The Friendly Word is a bimonthly magazine published by Quakers in Ireland. Rathgar Junior School and Newtown School, Waterford are Quaker-ethos schools. Drogheda Grammar School, while not governed by the Quakers, also follows broad Quaker values and hosts the Drogheda Quaker meeting. There is the Friends' School, Lisburn a preparatory school and grammar school. The Archives of the Religious Society of Friends are held in Quaker House, in Rathfarnham, and Meeting House, in Lisburn, County Antrim.

In Dublin, there are four Quaker Meeting Houses, in Eustace Street, Churchtown, Monkstown, and Rathfarnham. The Friends Burial Ground, Dublin is in Temple Hill, Blackrock, County Dublin. In Belfast, there are three meeting houses: South Belfast, Frederick Street, and Hillsborough. A meeting house was re-established in Limerick in the mid-1990s, beside the Quaker cemetery in Southville Gardens, Ballinacurra. There were earlier houses in Creagh Lane, and Cecil Street. The Cork Meeting House is in Summerhill South, Cork, opened in 1939 (replacing the 1833 house on Grattan St., itself a replacement for a 1678 house). There is a Quaker service every Sunday at St Nicholas National School, Waterside, Galway.

The Society decided at its 2018 Ireland Yearly Meeting to allow same-sex marriages in their Meetings for Worship.
