= Invisible Yet Enduring Lilacs =

Essay collection by Gerald Murnane

- 2007 edition
- Author: Gerald Murnane
- Publisher: Giramondo Publishing
- Publication date: 2005

Invisible Yet Enduring Lilacs is the title of a collection of essays by Melbourne writer Gerald Murnane, published by Giramondo Publishing in 2005.

The essays were originally published in various journals such as The Age Monthly Review, Meanjin and Scripsi over a period of twenty years from 1984 to 2003 and include many reflections on Murnane's own writing and his reading, particularly in essays such as "Why I Write What I Write" and "The Breathing Author".
