= Irish Film Institute =

Arthouse cinema, cultural center, and film archive in Dublin

- Institiúid Scannán[aíochta] na hÉireann
- Irish Film Centre (1992–2003); IFI

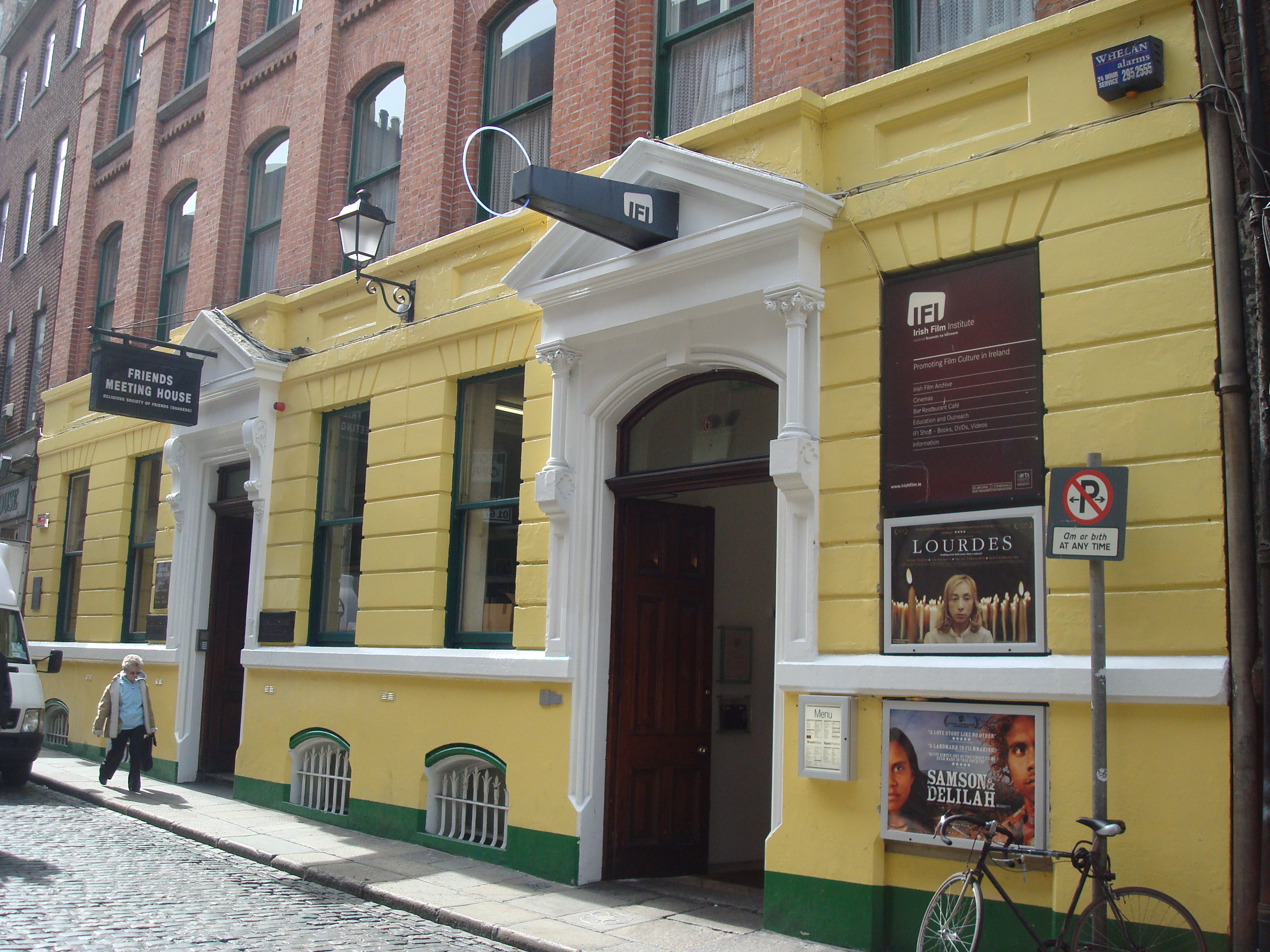

- Location within Central Dublin
- Address: 6 Eustace Street; Dublin; Ireland
- Coordinates: 53.3446°N 6.2649°W
- Capacity: 422 (258 + 106 + 58)
- Type: Cinema
- Screen: 3

Construction
- Opened: September 1992
- Architects: O'Donnell & Tuomey

Website
- ifi.ie

The Irish Film Institute (IFI; Irish: Institiúid Scannánaíochta na hÉireann, Institiúid Scannán na hÉireann), formerly the Irish Film Centre, is both an arthouse cinema and a national body that supports Irish film heritage. The IFI presents film festivals, retrospectives and curated seasons, along with independent, Irish and foreign language films overlooked by commercial multiplexes at its cinemas in the Temple Bar quarter of Dublin. It maintains an archive of Irish films and provides education in film culture.

The IFI increases the range of films available to Irish audiences. New releases, national seasons, directors' retrospectives, thematic programmes, festivals, and special events have been regular features of the programme. Every year, the IFI rewards its audiences by hosting an Open Day, with free cinema screenings and tours. In 2011, the IFI was awarded Dublin's Best Cinema in Dublin Living Awards. In its first two decades the IFI saw over 3.1 million cinema attendances to see 63,000 screenings of over 5,900 different films. The club has over 8,000 members. The IFI Irish Film Archive contains 611 different collections with over 26,000 cans of films, the oldest of which, a Lumiere brothers film of Dublin and Belfast, dates back to 1897.

The IFI is a company limited by guarantee with charitable status.

== History ==
The building in which the IFI now exists was once part of the old Friends' Meeting House, operated by Dublin's Quaker Community. The Meeting House was visited by Frederick Douglass, the anti-slavery leader, in September 1845 as a guest of the Quakers while he was on a visit promoting his book Narrative of the Life of Frederick Douglass, an American Slave. A plaque commemorating the event was unveiled by Dublin Lord Mayor Alison Gilliland on 21 October 2021.

The National Film Institute was founded in 1943 and incorporated in June 1945, under the control of Archbishop of Dublin John Charles McQuaid.

== IFI Irish Film Archive & Library ==
The IFI Irish Film Archive acquires, preserves and makes available Ireland's moving image heritage. Film reels, digital materials and document collections are held in vaults designed for the long-term storage of archival materials.

Named in honour of Tiernan MacBride in recognition of his contribution to the Irish film industry, the reference collection includes a wide range of books, journals, and reports covering both international and Irish cinema.

== IFI International ==
IFI International supports cultural exhibitors worldwide in curating exhibitions of new or classic Irish films, having worked with, for example, New York's MoMA and Lincoln Centre, New Delhi, Moscow, Brussels and Poland.

Supported by Culture Ireland, IFI International works with over 100 exhibition partners in more than 40 countries annually to develop a global audience for Irish film culture.

== Other activities ==
The IFI also provides a venue for debate and acts as a meeting place for a variety of groups. A series of public interviews has brought many international filmmakers and actors to IFI audiences over the years, including John Woo, Peter Greenaway, Dennis Hopper, Atom Egoyan, Sydney Pollack, Tim Roth, Joel Schumacher, Juliette Binoche, John C. Reilly, U2's Larry Mullen Jr. and Claude Miller. Evening courses offer opportunities to explore everything from Indian cinema and America independents to Spanish film, with lectures following each screening. Throughout the month, the IFI offers a wide range of activities and special screenings, including: The IFI Film Club (post-screening discussion), The Bigger Picture (A film chosen by a guest as a notable film canon), Wild Strawberries (morning screenings for the senior audiences), IFI Family (family-friendly films), Irish Focus (monthly showcase of new Irish film, often followed by a Q&A with filmmakers), Archive at Lunchtime (free archive screenings), Feast Your Eyes (dinner club screenings), Mystery Matinee (a surprise film each month), From the Vaults (a film from the archives) Afternoon Talks, Monthly Must-See Cinema, Experimental Film Club and others. Films from the IFI Irish Film Archive are subsequently restored and released on DVD over the years, including Seoda, GAA Gold, GAA Hurling Gold, GAA Football Gold, Irish Destiny, The O'Kalem Collection.

== Technology ==
In 2009, the IFI improved its facilities, including the introduction of digital sound, larger screens in each cinema, and the installation of Ireland's only functioning 70 mm projection system in Cinema 1. The IFI is the only cinema in the country screening films in all possible formats – from Digibeta, DVD, Blu-ray and DCP, to 8, 16, 35 or 70 mm. It also screens film in 3D.

== Financial model ==
The IFI operates a model of cultural enterprise, using core Arts Council subsidy to procure diverse income streams which are then invested back into core activities to minimise the impact to the public of Arts Council funding. The Arts Council's support of the IFI generates significant returns to the State, both economically and culturally. In 2010 the IFI used public subsidy of €800,000 to run a cultural organisation that employs 60 people and has an annual turnover of just over €3 million.

== Patrons ==
President Michael D. Higgins is the honorary Patron of the IFI.

== Venue ==
There are three cinemas: Cinema 1 has a capacity of 258; Cinema 2 holds 106 people; and Cinema 3 seats 58.

== See also ==
- Inland Fisheries Ireland, also known as IFI
