= The Plains (novel) =

1982 novel by Australian writer Gerald Murnane

- Cover of the 1984 Penguin edition
- Author: Gerald Murnane
- Language: English
- Genre: Literary
- Publisher: Norstrilia Press
- Publication date: 1982
- Publication place: Australia
- Media type: Print
- Pages: 126 pp.
- ISBN: 0909106096

The Plains (1982) is a novel by Australian writer Gerald Murnane.

== Synopsis ==
The novel follows a young man, who originates from "Outer Australia", and who has travelled inland to make a film about "The Plains" and the people who live there. He attaches himself to a wealthy landowner and for the next twenty years works in his patron's library making notes for his film to be titled "The Interior", while he slowly immerses himself in the culture of this wide land.

== Critical reception ==
Writing in The Age D. J. O'Hearn called the novel a "teasing and singular" work, going on to comment: "The odyssey of his film maker is the odyssey of any artist, the author included, and has therefore a kind of ironic poignancy."

Barry Oakley, in The Sydney Morning Herald, found that "like a diamond hidden in flannelette, is a piece of imaginative writing so remarkably sustained that it is a subject for meditation rather than mere reading."

== Publication history ==
After its original publication in 1982 by Norstrilia Press the novel was later reprinted as follows:

- 1984 Penguin Books, Australia
- 1985 George Braziller, USA
- 1990 McPhee Gribble, Australia
- 2000 Text Publishing, Australia
- 2003 New Issues Press, USA
- 2012 Text Publishing, Australia
- 2017 Text Publishing, Australia

The novel was also translated into Swedish in 2005, French in 2011, Hungarian in 2012, Catalan in 2014, Spanish in 2015, German in 2017, Italian in 2019, Finnish, Slovenian and Dutch in 2020, Danish in 2021, Albanian in 2022, Portuguese in 2024, and Norwegian in 2025.

== Awards ==
- 1982 The Age Book of the Year Awards, Fiction (or Imaginative Writing) Award, shortlisted

== Notes ==
- Epigraph: 'We had at length discovered a country ready for the immediate reception of civilised man...' (Thomas Livingstone Mitchell, Three Expeditions into the Interior of Eastern Australia).
- In The Age newspaper Stuart Sayers interviewed the author about the novel and its path to its publication.

== See also ==
- 1982 in Australian literature
