= Woolston, north Shropshire =

Coordinates: 52.812°N 3.006°W

Woolston
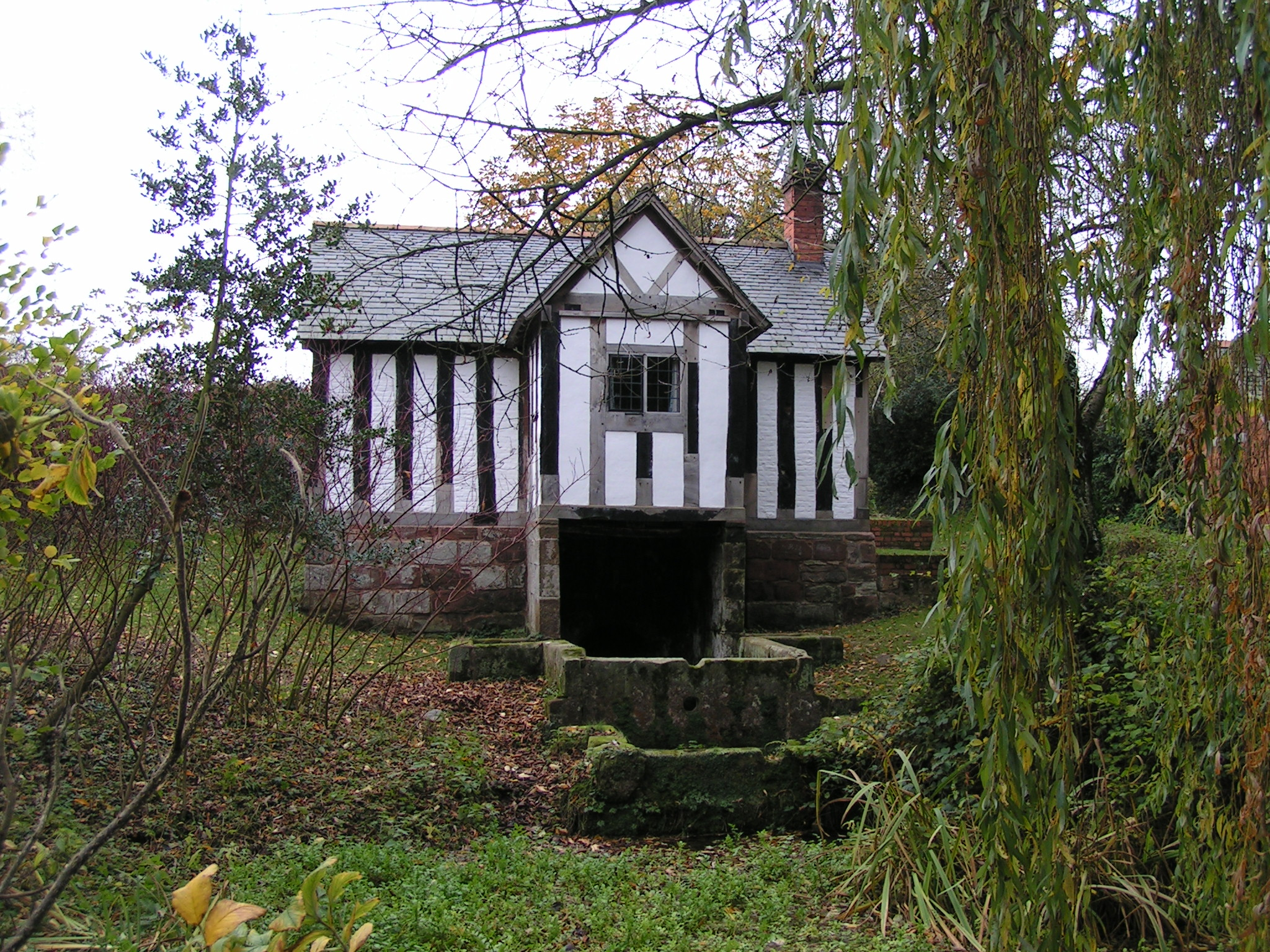
- St Winifred's Well, close to Woolston near Maesbury Marsh

- Location within Shropshire
- OS grid reference: SJ322242
- Civil parish: Oswestry Rural
- Unitary authority: Shropshire
- Ceremonial county: Shropshire
- Region: West Midlands
- Country: England
- Sovereign state: United Kingdom
- Post town: Oswestry
- Postcode district: SY10
- Dialling code: 01691
- Police: West Mercia
- Fire: Shropshire
- Ambulance: West Midlands
- UK Parliament: North Shropshire

Woolston, in the north of the county of Shropshire, England, is a hamlet located in the parish of Oswestry Rural, just to the south east of Maesbury Marsh, near Oswestry (in the St Oswald electoral division of Shropshire Council unitary authority, previously part of the borough of Oswestry until its abolition in 2009).

Nearby is St Winifred's Well. According to legend, it is thought that on her way to Shrewsbury Abbey, Winifred's body was laid there overnight and a spring sprang up out of the ground. The well is covered by a 15th-century half-timbered cottage. The water flows through a series of stone troughs and into a large pond, which then flows into a stream. The cottage is maintained by the Landmark Trust.
