= Mr. Simms Olde Sweet Shoppe =

British sweet shop chain

Mr Simms Sweet Shop
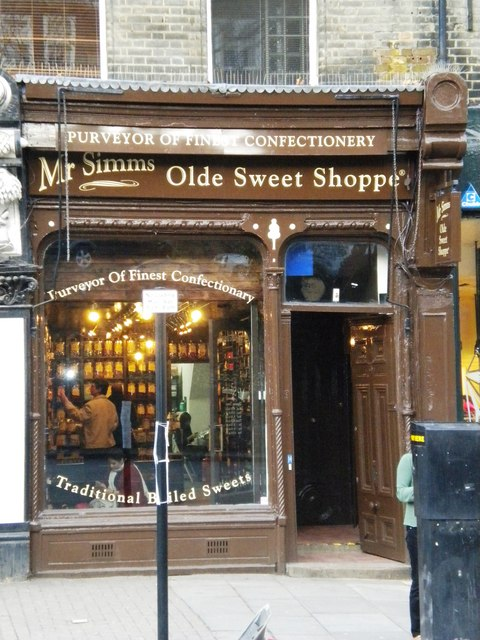
- Mr Simms on Hampstead High Street
- Formerly: Mr Simms Olde Sweet Shoppe
- Company type: Private
- Founded: September 2004; Leek, England
- Headquarters: Stafford, England
- Areas served: United Kingdom; Hong Kong
- Website: mrsimms.co

Mr Simms Sweet Shop is a British sweet shop chain offering a range of products, primarily boiled sweets, in shops noted for their Victorian architecture. The first shop opened in Leek in September 2004, though the company is now headquartered in nearby Stafford. There are currently over 70 branches in the United Kingdom and Hong Kong.
