= Gerald Murnane =

Australian writer

Gerald Murnane AO
- Born: 25 February 1939 (age 87); Coburg, Victoria, Australia
- Occupations: novelist; short story writer; poet; essayist; school and college teacher
- Spouse: Catherine Mary Murnane (m. 1966; died 2009)
- Children: 3
- Writing career
- Notable works: Tamarisk Row (1974); The Plains (1982); Inland (1988); Barley Patch (2009); Border Districts (2017)
- Notable awards: Patrick White Award (1999); Melbourne Prize for Literature (2009); Prime Minister's Literary Awards (2018)

Gerald Murnane (born 25 February 1939) AO is an Australian novelist, short story writer, poet and essayist. He has won acclaim for his distinctive prose and exploration of memory, perception, identity and the Australian landscape, often blurring fiction and autobiography in the process. Murnane has published 14 books between 1974 and 2021, perhaps his best-known being the 1982 novel The Plains.

Murnane is now considered to be one of Australia's greatest writers with a substantial international reputation, after finding a larger readership only since the 2000s. The New York Times described Murnane in 2018 as "the greatest living English-language writer most people have never heard of". The Sydney Morning Herald wrote in 2014: "No living Australian writer, not even Les Murray, has higher claims to permanence or a richer sense of distinction".

Murnane's work has been richly praised by international authors like J. M. Coetzee, Jon Fosse and Ben Lerner, and Teju Cole has called him "a genius on the level of Beckett". He is regularly tipped to win the Nobel Prize in Literature.

== Life ==
=== Early life ===
Murnane was born in Coburg, a suburb of Melbourne in the Australian state of Victoria, as one of four children of a Catholic family with an English-Irish background. A brother of his had an intellectual disability, was repeatedly hospitalised and died in 1985.

His father worked at one time as a prison guard, but was also an often heavily indebted horse racing gambler, which led to frequent moves and financial problems for the family. Parts of Gerald Murnane's childhood were spent in Bendigo and the Western District. In 1956, he graduated from De La Salle College, Malvern.

=== Career ===
Murnane briefly trained for the Roman Catholic priesthood in 1957. He abandoned this path after six months, saying that he lost his belief in a religion in a traditional sense, though he states he still believes in a "survival of the soul". He instead became a teacher, working in primary schools from 1960 to 1968, and also at the Victoria Racing Club's Apprentice Jockeys' School.

Studying part-time next to his teaching, Murnane received a Bachelor of Arts from the University of Melbourne in 1969 in English and Arabic. He then worked as an editor in the Victorian Education Department until 1973. He quit this job to devote more time to writing and took care of his three children as a stay-at-home-dad while his wife went to work.

After publishing his first two novels in 1974 and 1976, he began to teach creative writing at various tertiary institutions starting in 1980, most notably at Prahran College. When it was dissolved into Deakin University, he resigned in 1995 out of frustration with the bureaucracy of the university administration. Afterwards, he took a part-time job bundling newspapers and magazines for extra money, before retiring from professional life.

Murnane had stopped writing for a public altogether following his 1995 book Emerald Blue, which sold only about 600 copies. Publisher Ivor Indyk's interest in further works led Murnane to begin preparing new publications again after 2001. Starting with the publishing of Invisible Yet Enduring Lilacs in 2005, Murnane crafted an extensive late work with a number of books, mostly published at Indyk's Giramondo Publishing, before retiring again in 2021 with Last Letter to a Reader.

=== Personal life ===
Murnane married Catherine Mary Murnane, a teacher, in 1966. The couple has three sons. In 1969, Murnane and his family moved to the Melbourne suburb of Macleod, where they lived for the following decades.

After his wife died of cancer in 2009, Murnane moved to the 300-people-town Goroke in country Victoria, living in a one-room studio next to his son's house. He is involved in Goroke's local Men's shed and occasionally bartends for the local golf club, where he also plays golf.

=== Hobbies and interests ===
Murnane has a number of interests which also leave traces in his literary work. He is a passionate follower of horse racing, as well as a dedicated golfer and private beer brewer. Horse racing often serves as a metaphor in his work. A documentary, Words and Silk – The Real and Imaginary Worlds of Gerald Murnane (1989), directed by Philip Tyndall, examined Murnane's childhood, work, approach to the craft of writing, and specifically his interest in horse racing.

Murnane is also an avid record-keeper and archivist. Since the 1960s, he has maintained three growing archives containing drafts, personal thoughts and notes, archived articles about himself and his work, correspondence, and fictional horse races thought up by himself. As of 2022, the three archives span twenty-four drawers in six steel filing cabinets. Small glimpses into the archive have already been published, and it is rumored that it will be made accessible after the death of Murnane and his siblings.

Murnane taught himself Hungarian in his 50s after having read Gyula Illyés' People of the Puszta. He is known for never having left Australia, and his home state of Victoria only for a few times. He has never been on an airplane and does not use a television or computer. He types his works on typewriters. Over his career, he kept himself mostly out of the literary scene, never attending writers' conferences and rarely giving readings.

Among his literary influences and favorite writers are Marcel Proust, Emily Brontë, Gyula Illyés, Lesbia Harford, William Carlos Williams, Thomas Hardy, and John Clare, some of them are also mentioned in his work.

== Work ==
Murnane's first two books, Tamarisk Row (1974) and A Lifetime on Clouds (1976), seem to be semi-autobiographical accounts of his childhood and adolescence. Both are composed largely of very long but grammatical sentences. A Lifetime on Clouds was the subject to heavy, unwanted cuts by Murnane's publisher. A Season on Earth, the unabridged version of this book, was first printed in 2019.

In 1982, he attained his mature style with The Plains, a short novel about an unnamed filmmaker who travels to "inner Australia", where he endeavours to film the plains under the patronage of wealthy landowners. The novel has been termed a fable, parable or allegory. The novel is both a metaphysical parable about appearance and reality, and a parodic examination of traditions and cultural horizons. It has been suggested that the book's opening features a narrator expressing an outlook that is typical to Murnane's writing:

Twenty years ago, when I first arrived on the plains, I kept my eyes open. I looked for anything in the landscape that seemed to hint at some elaborate meaning behind appearances.

My journey to the plains was much less arduous than I afterwards described it. And I cannot even say that at a certain hour I knew I had left Australia. But I recall clearly a succession of days when the flat land around me seemed more and more a place that only I could interpret.

The Plains was followed by Landscape With Landscape (1985), Inland (1988), Velvet Waters (1990), and Emerald Blue (1995). A book of essays, Invisible Yet Enduring Lilacs, appeared in 2005. These books are all concerned with the relation between memory, image, and landscape, and frequently with the relation between fiction and non-fiction, using elements of autofiction and metafiction.

2009 saw the release of Murnane's first work of fiction in over a decade, Barley Patch, which was followed by A History of Books in 2012 and A Million Windows in 2014. Will Heyward, in a review of A Million Windows for Music & Literature, suggests that these three latter works may be seen as a single, continuous project, containing "a form of fiction defined by a fragmentary style that avoids plot and characterization, and is instead narrated by association and the fugue-like repetition and variation of images."

In 2015, his memoir Something for the Pain: A Memoir of the Turf was released, centering around his love of horse racing and the role it had in his life. In 2017, his autobiographical novel Border Districts was published, receiving the Prime Minister's Literary Award and a shortlisting for the Miles Franklin Award during the following year. In June 2018, Murnane released a spoken word album, Words in Order. The centrepiece is a 1600-word palindrome written by Murnane, which he recites over a minimalist musical score. He also performs works by Thomas Hardy, Dezső Kosztolányi, DEVO and Killdozer. 2018 also saw the release of Murnane's collected short fiction in a book.

In 2019, Murnane's first and only poetry collection Green Shadows and Other Poems was published. During the COVID-19 pandemic, Murnane wrote Last Letter to a Reader (2021), a book in which he chronologically sums up his thoughts on all of his works. He stated that it would be his last book, though he still writes privately for his archives according to a 2026 interview.

== Reception ==
Murnane is now considered to be one of Australia's most important contemporary writers and, according to The New Yorker, seen as "a Giant of Australian Letters". Murnane's work is admired by the Literature Nobel Prize winners J. M. Coetzee and Jon Fosse (who translated Murnane's The Plains into Norwegian), as well as Joshua Cohen, Teju Cole, Merve Emre, and Ben Lerner.

However, Murnane was long considered a literary outsider even in the Australian literary scene, whose writing "often divided local critics" in Australia. His literature, which eschews normal plots and characters and is mostly unpolitical, did not sell well and also did not win any major awards until he received the Patrick White Award in 1999. In the 2000s, interest in Murnane's work grew, partly due to an academic conference in 2001, as well as publications in the US and Sweden. In 2006, he was nominated for the Nobel Prize in Literature, and frequently after that. Since the late 2010s, betting agencies often rank him among the favorites to win the prize.

During the 2010s and 2020s, reception further increased due to international publishings of his work, a second academic conference in 2017 in Goroke's golf club, and reception in international online communities. Particularly notable was a long The New York Times profile in 2018, in which writer Mark Binelli called Murnane "the greatest living English-language writer most people have never heard of".

According to literary scholars such as Genoni and Stimson, Murnane's transnational reception was particularly helped by the post-national, universal themes of his books, even though the described settings and landscapes in his work are very Australian at the same time. Stimson also concluded that Murnane's eccentric persona and his decision to follow his own unique writing style instead of catering to fashionable demands of the literary scene attracted an international community of readers: "Murnane offered a vision of the authentic, non-commercial, avant-garde maverick", Stimson writes, while noticing that this vision is also sold itself by Murnane's publishers.

His works have been translated (as of 2026) into Italian (starting with Velvet Waters as Una Melodia in 1994), German (four books published by Suhrkamp Verlag), Spanish (four books, published by Editorial Minúscula and Gristormenta), Catalan (The Plains as Les planes, also published by Editorial Minúscula), Swedish (five translations since the 2000s), Norwegian, French, and Serbian, among other languages. Starting in 2019, And Other Stories has published a number of Murnane's work in the United Kingdom.

== Awards and honours ==
- Patrick White Award (1999)
- A Special Award in the New South Wales Premier's Literary Awards (2007)
- The Australia Council emeritus award (2008)
- Melbourne Prize for Literature (2009)
- Adelaide Festival Awards for Literature 2010 Award for Innovation in Writing
- A Million Windows short-listed for the New South Wales Premier's Literary Awards Christina Stead Award for Fiction (2015)
- Victorian Premier's Literary Award for Non-Fiction, 2016
- Prime Minister's Literary Awards for Fiction, for Border Districts, 2018
- NSW Premier's Literary Awards, shortlisted: Christina Stead Prize for Fiction for Border Districts, 2019
- Officer of the Order of Australia in the 2026 King's Birthday Honours in recognition of "distinguished service to literature as an author and novelist, and to tertiary education".

In July/August 2017, The Plains was the number 1 book recommendation of South West German Radio's literature list (SWR2), crafted through a survey of German literature critics.

== Bibliography ==
=== Novels ===
- (1974) Tamarisk Row. William Heinemann Australia, Melbourne.
- (1976) A Lifetime on Clouds. William Heinemann Australia, Melbourne.
- (1982) The Plains. Norstrilia Press, Melbourne.
- (1988) Inland. William Heinemann Australia, Melbourne.
- (2009) Barley Patch. Giramondo Publishing Company, Sydney.
- (2012) A History of Books. Giramondo Publishing Company, Sydney.
- (2014) A Million Windows. Giramondo Publishing Company, Sydney.
- (2017) Border Districts. Giramondo Publishing Company, Sydney.
- (2019) A Season on Earth. Text Publishing, Melbourne. Unabridged edition of A Lifetime on Clouds

=== Short story collections ===
- (1985) Landscape with Landscape. Norstrilia Press, Melbourne.
- (1990) Velvet Waters. McPhee Gribble, Melbourne.
- (1995) Emerald Blue. McPhee Gribble, Melbourne.
- (2018) Collected Short Fiction. Giramondo Publishing Company, Sydney. Simultaneous release in the US as Stream System: The Collected Short Fiction of Gerald Murnane. New York: Farrar, Straus, & Giroux. Collects the pieces in Velvet Waters and Emerald Blue, with the titular piece of Invisible Yet Enduring Lilacs, one uncollected short story, and three appended to A History of Books.

=== Essay collection ===
- (2005) Invisible Yet Enduring Lilacs. Giramondo Publishing Company, Sydney.
- (2021) Last Letter to a Reader. Giramondo Publishing Company, Sydney.

=== Poetry collection ===
- (2019) Green Shadows and Other Poems. Giramondo Publishing Company, Sydney.

=== Memoir ===
- (2015) Something for the Pain: A Memoir of the Turf. Text Publishing, Melbourne.
