= Inland (Murnane novel) =

Novel by Gerald Murnane

- First edition
- Author: Gerald Murnane
- Language: English
- Publisher: William Heinemann Australia
- Publication date: 1988
- Publication place: Australia
- ISBN: 978-1-922146-28-1

Inland is a novel by Gerald Murnane, first published in 1988. It has been described as one of Murnane's greatest and most ambitious works, although some reviewers have criticised its use of repetition, lack of clear structure and reliance on writing as a subject matter. Reviewing the book in 2012, J. M. Coetzee called it "the most ambitious, sustained, and powerful piece of writing Murnane has to date brought off".

Set in the plains of Hungary, the United States and Australia, Inland explores themes of memory, landscape, longing, love, and writing.

The book was republished, with worldwide rights (excluding Australia and New Zealand), in January 2024 by And Other Stories.

== Inspiration ==
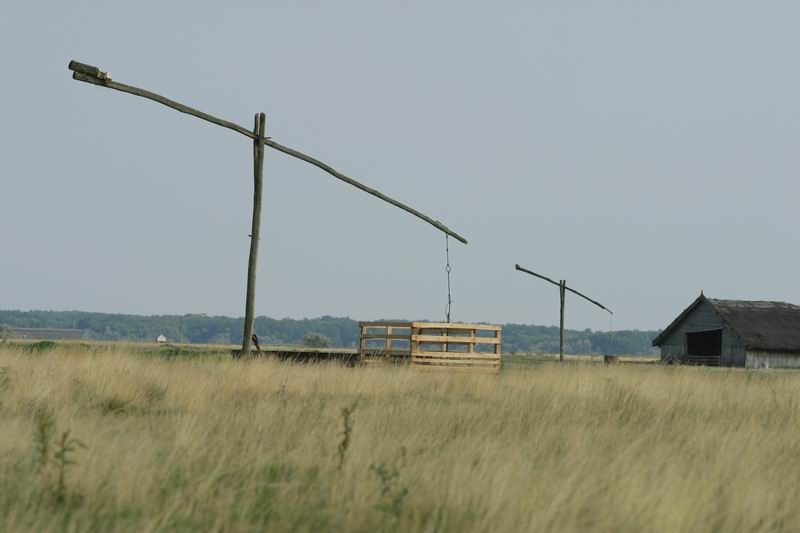
Typical draw well in the Puszta in Hortobágy National Park

In 1977, Murnane read A Puszták népe (People of the Puszta) by the Hungarian poet and novelist Gyula Illyés. The book had such a profound effect on him that it not only made him learn the Hungarian language, but also compelled him to write a book – Inland – in order to "relieve [his] feelings", as he later put it. In a 2014 interview, Murnane described one passage in particular as having changed his life, a passage describing cowherds pulling the body of a young woman out of a well:

Of all the images that I have in mind, that one has probably yielded the most and has perhaps even still the most to yield. It caused me to learn the Hungarian language, for one thing, and to be able to quote the whole of that passage in Hungarian. [Speaks Hungarian] – that's the cowherds pulled her out when they watered the cattle at dawn section. And I wrote the book Inland and the well just keeps occurring – I don't go looking for it, it comes looking for me. And it occurs in numerous places, as you've said, in other books and things I have written.

A quote of this passage (from the English translation of A Puszták népe) appears towards the end of Inland itself.

== Plot summary ==
Inland has been described as a complex work of fiction, lacking plot and characters in the traditional sense.

The early parts of the book are set in Szolnok County, Hungary, where the narrator is writing in "heavy-hearted Magyar" to his editor and translator, Anne Kristaly Gunnarsen. Gunnarsen lives with her husband in Ideal, South Dakota, where they are both working at the Calvin O. Dahlberg Institute of Prairie Studies.

The second half of the book is mainly set in Australia and concerns the narrator's trying to find the address of a girl (referred to only as "the girl from Bendigo Street") he once knew as a child.

== Interpretations ==
Inland is set partly on the Great Alfold in Hungary, partly in the grasslands of Tripp County, South Dakota, and partly in Melbourne (between the Moonee Ponds and the Merri) and Warrnambool (between the Hopkins and Russels Creek), Australia. The geographical shifts in the book's narrative have been interpreted by some as indicating the presence of multiple, separate narrators, although Murnane himself denies this, stating that he "consider[s] the book to have only one narrator and not the several that some readers have seemed to find".

Some commentators have taken the recurring plains and grasslands to be metaphors of the author's metaphysics. The book's narrator repeatedly declares what Murnane has called "a little musical phrase": that "no thing in the world is one thing" and that "each place is more than one place". In a Heideggerian reading, Murphy suggests that the narrator, in describing his experience of wind moving over a landscape, is able to "[transpose] his understanding of his immersion in the physical world to the ontological world".

The book contains numerous references to other literary works. At one point in the book, the narrator discovers an epigraph in a novel by Patrick White: "One day in this room I read in the preliminary pages of an unlikely book these words: 'There is another world but it is in this one. Paul Eluard'". The narrator also describes at length his memories of having read Emily Brontë's Wuthering Heights and Thomas Hardy's Tess of the D'Urbervilles, and quotes from a number of works, including a book by W. H. Hudson, a biography of Marcel Proust, the New Testament and, as mentioned above, Gyula Illyés's People of the Puszta.

In a foreword to the 2013 edition, Murnane, worried that he might have put into the text "more of [himself] than was seemly", wrote that, as he was reading the page proofs for the reissue, he was "surprised and relieved to learn how much of the text must have sprung not from its author's memory but from those other sources often called collectively the imagination."

== Reception ==
Internationally, Inland did not initially capture a large readership. It appeared in the United Kingdom, where it had only a single review and scant sales. In 1995, a Swedish translation of the book (Inlandet) was released; this edition did not garner much attention, although reviews of Murnane's work, including Inland, have generally been kinder in Scandinavia than in the US and UK. Helen Harris, reviewing the book for the Times Literary Supplement, wrote that "[by] constantly game-playing and undermining the edifice of his own fiction, Murnane is left with an end product too artificial to have much evocative force". Another reviewer considered the book's use of repetition and its "disappointing, stagnant rendering of memory, time, and fantasy" to make it tedious to read.

However, in 2012, after its having been re-released in the US, Inland was the subject of a lengthy review by J. M. Coetzee, published in the New York Review of Books, that described it as Murnane's most ambitious and powerful work to date. Coetzee wrote: "The emotional conviction behind the later parts of Inland is so intense, the somber lyricism so moving, the intelligence behind the chiseled sentences so undeniable, that we suspend all disbelief". Peter Craven, writing in The Sydney Morning Herald, called it "a work that dazzles the mind with its grandeur and touches the heart with a great wave of feeling".

The book has also been the subject of several PhD theses and other scholarly work.

== Cited texts ==
- Fawkner, Harald William (1 January 2006). Grasses that Have No Fields: From Gerald Murnane's Inland to a Phenomenology of Isogonic Constitution. Stockholm University. ISBN 9789185445226.
- Murnane, Gerald (2013). Inland. Artarmon, New South Wales: Giramondo Publishing Company. ISBN 978-1-922146-28-1.
- Murphy, Julian (2014). "Being-in-landscape: a Heideggerian reading of landscape in Gerald Murnane's Inland". Journal of the Association for the Study of Australian Literature.
