= St. Winifred's Well, Dublin =

St. Winifred's Well
- Tobar Úna (Irish)
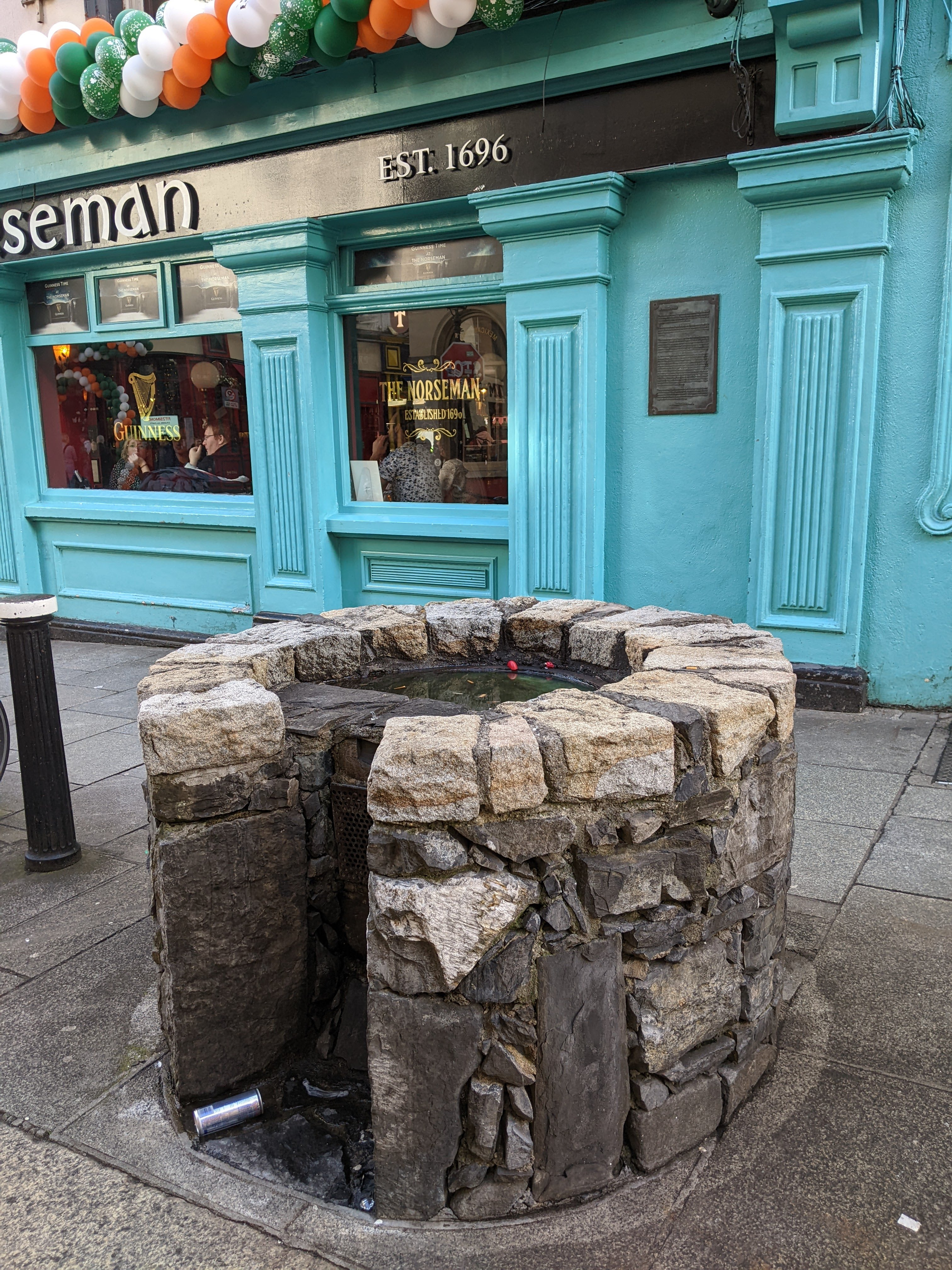

- Location within Central Dublin
- 53°20′43″N 6°15′53″W
- Type: Well
- Location: Eustace Street, Dublin, Ireland

History
- Built: c. 1680–1720

St. Winifred's Well is a 17th/18th-century well located in Dublin, Ireland.

== Location ==
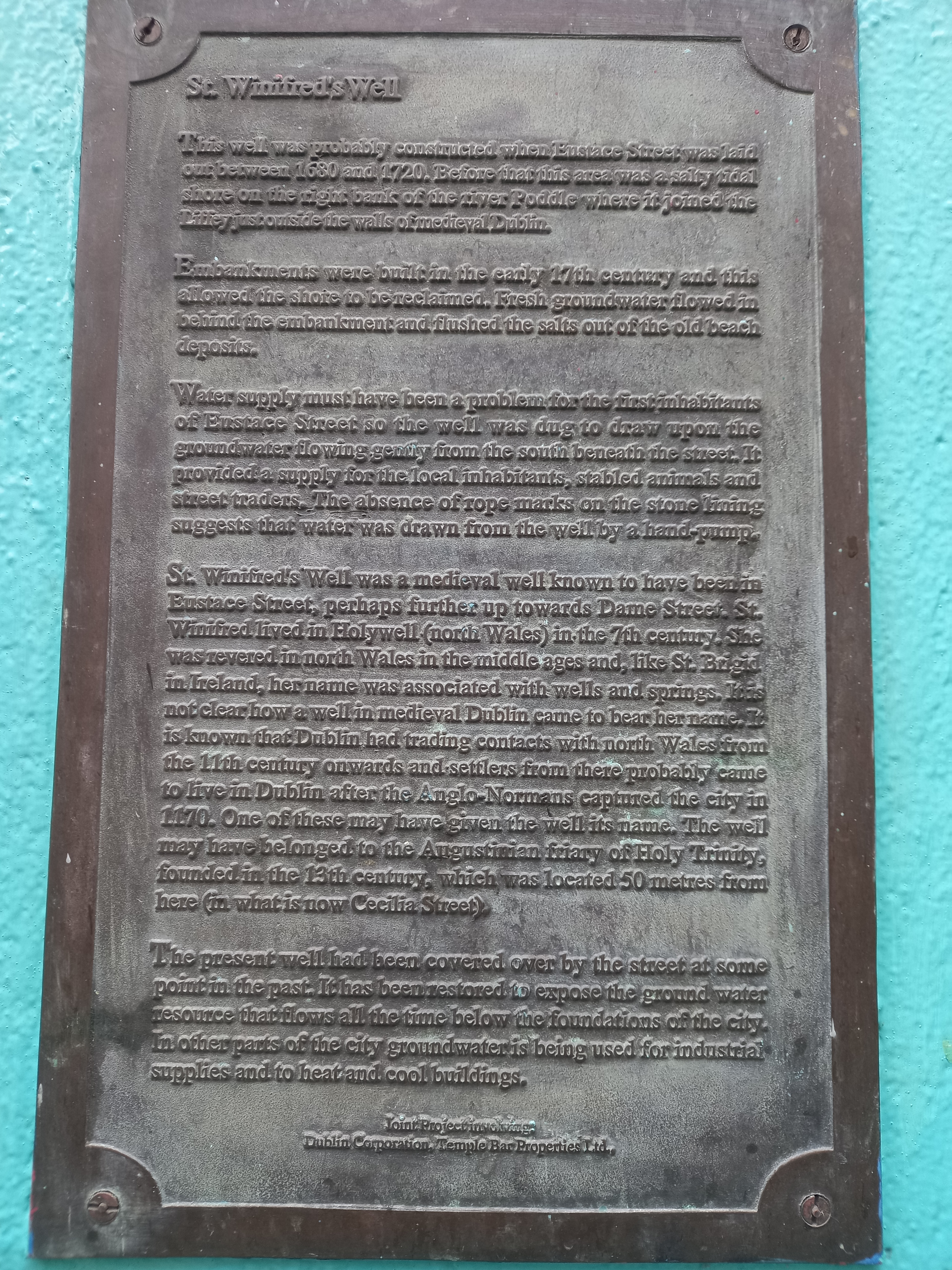
Informational plaque

St. Winifred's Well is located on Eustace Street, 60 m (66 yd) to the south of the River Liffey, outside the Norseman pub.

== History ==
St Winifred’s Well was built c. 1680-1720 when Eustace Street was laid out. Its name, referring to the Welsh Saint Winifred, is probably explained by the presence of Welsh and English merchants in the area.

Archeologists believe the water was taken using a hand pump, due to the absence of rope marks on the stonework. The well was rediscovered in the early 1990s.
