= Gwytherin =

Village in Conwy County Borough, Wales

Coordinates: 53.139°N 3.681°W

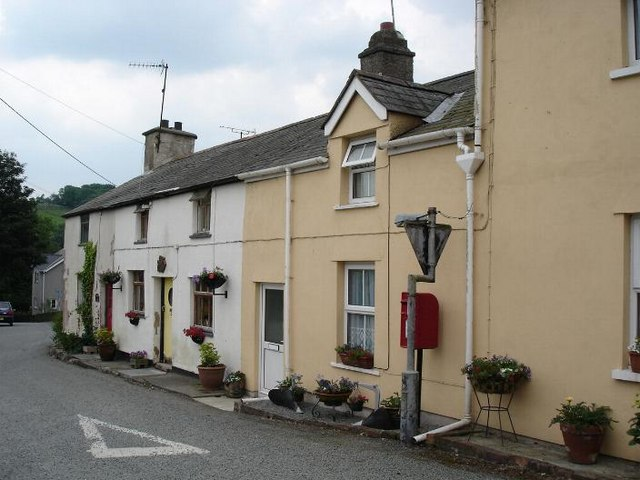
- Gwytherin cottages

- Location within Conwy
- OS grid reference: SH876614
- Community: Llangernyw
- Principal area: Conwy
- Preserved county: Clwyd
- Country: Wales
- Sovereign state: United Kingdom
- Post town: ABERGELE
- Postcode district: LL22
- Dialling code: 01745
- Police: North Wales
- Fire: North Wales
- Ambulance: Welsh
- UK Parliament: Bangor Aberconwy
- Senedd Cymru – Welsh Parliament: Clwyd West

Gwytherin is a village in Conwy County Borough, Wales. It lies in a small valley through which the River Cledwen flows and has been winner of 'Best Kept Village' on four occasions. Its church is dedicated to Saint Winefrid (Welsh: Gwenfrewy gwenfrewi; Medieval Latin: Winefrida).

In the centre of the village opposite the Lion Inn is the Church of St Winifred, which was built and dedicated in 1869. The church is believed to have originated in the mid-600s AD up by Prince Eleri who then went on to set up a double monastery in the village. He was the Abbot to the monks, and his cousin's daughter, St. Gwenffrewi, was the Abbess to the nuns.

In the churchyard are three ancient yew trees and a row of four ancient standing stones approximately one metre high and aligned roughly east to west. The first stone carries a carving and what appears to be a 'W'. Following the death of St. Winifred, her body was buried in said churchyard. The exact meaning of the village's name is not well understood. However, modern scholars and historians attribute the name to the 6th-century Celtic saint, St. Gwytherin. The village existed as a clas long before it was first written down as Guythrein in 1254. The underlying personal name, Gwythyr, is the Welsh variant of the Latin name, Victor (meaning "victorious").

The church is one of the major places visited on the North Wales Pilgrims Way.

== In Literature ==
Gwytherin is the setting for much of the action in the novel A Morbid Taste for Bones, first published in 1977 by Ellis Peters. It was the first book in a series of twenty to introduce the fictional Brother Cadfael, the real Prior Robert Pennant, and the rest of the monks at Shrewsbury Abbey in the 12th century.

== Gallery ==
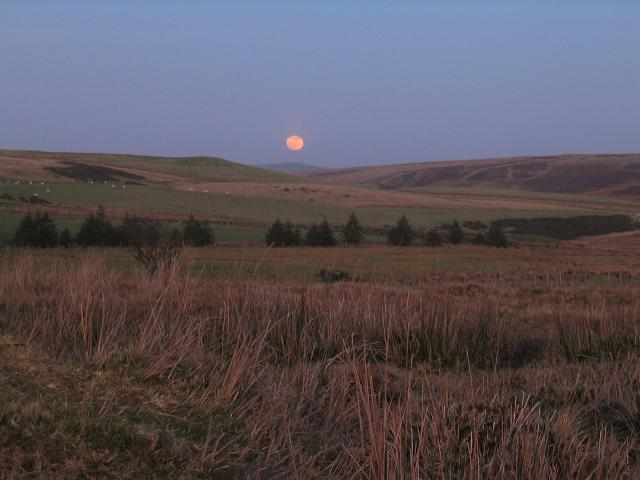
Moonrise over Aled valley.

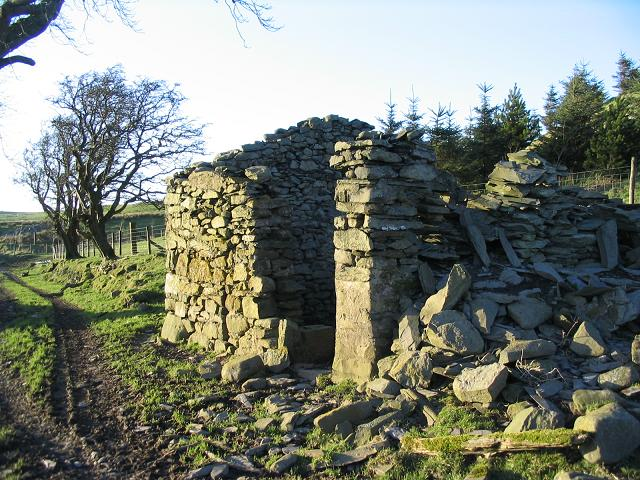
Ruin near Pant-y-fotty
