= Shackleton (disambiguation) =

Ernest Shackleton (1874–1922) was an Anglo-Irish polar explorer.

Shackleton or Shackelton may also refer to:

== People ==
- Shackleton (surname), a list of people
- Shackleton (musician), British musician and producer Sam Shackleton

== Places ==
=== Antarctica ===
- Shackleton Range, Coats Land, a mountain range
- Mount Shackleton, Graham Land
- Shackleton Glacier, Queen Maud Mountains
- Shackleton Ice Shelf, Queen Mary Land
- Shackleton Limestone, Ross Dependency, a Cambrian limestone formation
- Shackleton Gap, South Georgia Island
- Shackleton Valley, South Georgia Island

=== Communities ===
- Shackleton, Western Australia, a town
- Shackleton, Saskatchewan, Canada, a special service area, formerly a village
- Shackelton, Georgia, United States, a ghost town
- Shackleton, Zimbabwe, a village

=== Other places ===
- Mount Shackleton (British Columbia), Canada
- Shackleton fracture zone, an undersea fracture zone, oceanic ridge and fault in the Drake Passage
- Shackleton (crater), a crater on the Moon

== Ships ==
- RRS Ernest Shackleton, a ship used by the British Antarctic Survey
- RRS Shackleton, a ship of the British Antarctic Survey that served in the 1950s and 1960s

== Arts and entertainment ==
=== Television ===
- Shackleton (1983 TV series), a 1983 UK television miniseries on Ernest Shackleton
- Shackleton (TV serial), a 2001 UK television miniseries on Ernest Shackleton, starring Kenneth Branagh
- Shackleton: Death or Glory, a 2013 documentary series

=== Literature ===
- Shackleton: Antarctic Odyssey, a 2014 graphic novel
- Kate Shackleton, fictional character created by Frances Brody, protagonist of a series of crime novels

== Other uses ==
- Avro Shackleton, a Royal Air Force maritime patrol aircraft
- Shackleton Energy Company, formed in 2007 with the goal to prepare the equipment and technologies necessary for mining the Moon

== See also ==
- The Shackeltons, a Pennsylvania-based rock group
