= Shackleton (surname) =

Shackleton is an English surname which may refer to:

- Abraham Shackleton (1696–1771), English Quaker schoolmaster
- Alan Shackleton (1934–2009), English footballer
- Charlie Shackleton (born 1991), British filmmaker and multimedia artist
- David Shackleton (1863–1938), British cotton worker and trade unionist
- David Shackleton (admiral) (born 1948), Royal Australian Navy vice admiral
- Derek Shackleton (1924–2007), English cricketer
- D. R. Shackleton Bailey (1917–2005), English scholar of Latin literature
- Edward Shackleton, Baron Shackleton (1911–1994), British geographer and politician
- Elizabeth Shackleton (1726–1781), English diarist
- Ernest Shackleton (1874–1922), Irish Antarctic explorer
- Fiona Shackleton (born 1956), English lawyer
- Greg Shackleton (1946–1975), Australian journalist, member of the Balibo Five
- Jamie Shackleton (born 1999), English footballer
- Jane Shackleton (1843–1909), pioneering Irish photographer
- Janet Shackleton (1928–2021), New Zealand hurdler
- John Shackleton (died 1767), British painter and draughtsman
- Julian Shackleton (born 1952), English cricketer
- Keith Shackleton (1923–2015) British natural history painter and broadcaster
- Len Shackleton (1922–2000), English footballer
- Luke Shackleton (born 1984), Australian rules footballer
- Lydia Shackleton (1828–1914), Irish botanic artist
- Megan Shackleton (born 1999), British Paralympic table tennis player
- Michael Shackleton, 21st century South African politician
- Nicholas Shackleton (1937–2006), British geologist and climatologist
- Polly Shackleton (1910–1997), American politician
- Richard Shackleton (1726–1792), Irish Quaker schoolmaster and poet
- Richard Shackleton Pope (1793–1884), British architect
- Robert Shackleton (1919–1986), British philologist and librarian
- Robert Millner Shackleton (1909–2001), British field geologist
- Roger Shackleton (born 1948), English former international rugby union player
- Sam Shackleton, Scottish folk musician
- Sam Arthur Shackleton, British dubstep music producer
- Scott Shackleton (born 1961), American politician
- Shane Shackleton (born 1982), Australian rugby league player
- Simon Shackleton, English musician, producer and DJ
- William Shackleton (1908–1971), English cricketer
- York Shackleton (born 1974), American filmmaker and snowboarder
