= Abraham Shackleton (theologian) =

Irish schoolmaster, theologian and abolitionist (1752–1818)

- Born: 8 December 1752; Ballitore, County Kildare, Ireland
- Died: 2 August 1818 (aged 65); Ballitore, County Kildare, Ireland
- Resting place: Ballitore Quaker Burial Ground
- Occupation: Schoolmaster
- Spouse: Lydia Mellor (m. 1779)
- Children: 9
- Father: Richard Shackleton
- Relatives: Mary Leadbeater (half-sister); Abraham Shackleton (grandfather)

Abraham Shackleton (8 December 1752 – 2 August 1818) was an Irish schoolmaster of Ballitore Quaker School, theologian and abolitionist. In 1801, Shackleton was disowned by the Quakers as part of the Irish separation.

== Biography ==
Shackleton was born on 8 December 1752 in Ballitore, County Kildare to Quaker parents Elizabeth Fuller (1726–1754) and Richard Shackleton, the schoolmaster of Ballitore Quaker School and poet. The eldest of four siblings, Shackleton's mother died when he was two years old. From his father's second marriage to Elizabeth Carleton (1726–1804), the matron of Ballitore Quaker School, Shackleton had four younger half-siblings including the author Mary Leadbeater. Through his father Shackleton was the partneral grandson of Abraham Shackleton, the founder and inaugural schoolmaster of the Ballitore Quaker School.

On 29 April 1756, Shackleton entered Ballitore Quaker School. Later becoming a teacher, Shackleton succeeded his father as schoolmaster in 1779. A committed abolitionist and pacifist, Shackleton was close friends with the founder of Cork Anti-Slavery Society, Joshua Beale, and gave up the use of produce of slave labour including sugar and tea. Disowned at the Carlow monthly meeting in 1801, Shackleton's disownment was part of the larger Irish separation.

In 1815, Shackleton published The court of Apollo, with other minor poems.

== Personal life ==
On 23 February 1779, Shackleton married Lydia Mellor (1749–1829) with whom he had 9 children.

Shackleton died at home on 2 August 1818, aged 65. Despite being disowned, Shackleton was buried at the Ballitore Quaker Burial Ground.
