= Mary Irwin =

Mary Irwin may refer to:

- Mary Ann Irwin (born 1960), Irish politician
- Mary Jane Irwin (21st century), American computer scientist
