= John Richardson Wigham =

Scotch-Irish inventor and lighthouse engineer (1829–1906)

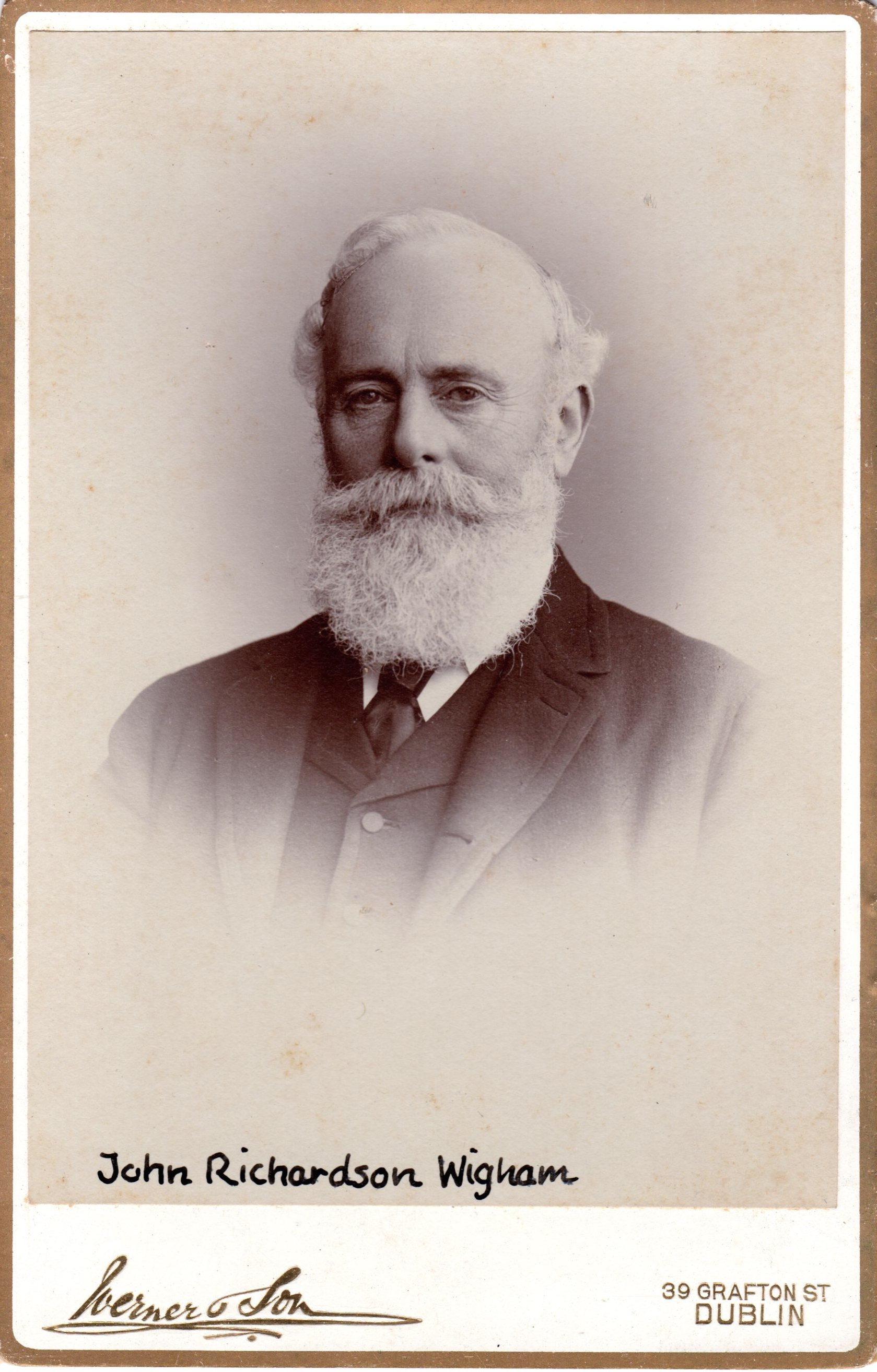
- Born: 15 January 1829; Newington, Edinburgh, Scotland
- Died: 16 November 1906 (aged 77); Dublin, Ireland
- Spouse: Mary Pim
- Scientific career
- Fields: Lighthouse engineering

This article concerns the Irish-based inventor and lighthouse engineer, not his cousin the shipbuilder John Wigham Richardson.

John Richardson Wigham (15 January 1829 – 16 November 1906) was a prominent lighthouse engineer of the 19th century.

== Early life ==
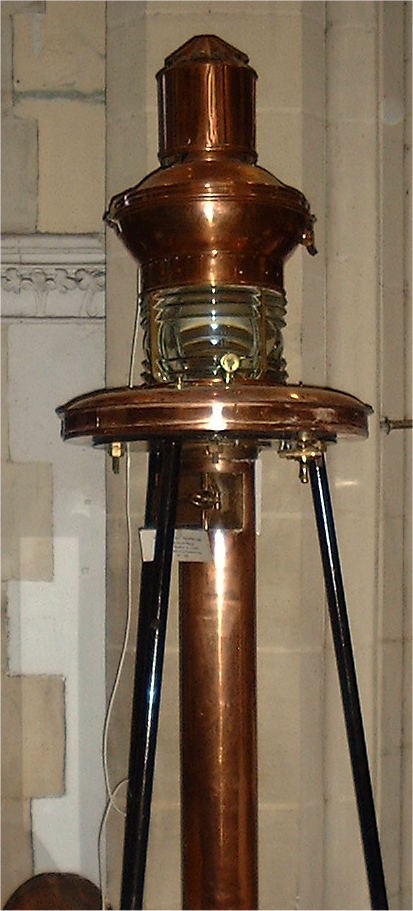
Wigham's 31-day oil lamp in the National Maritime Museum of Ireland.

John Richardson Wigham was born to a Quaker family in Newington, Edinburgh, Scotland. His father, John, operated a mill for the manufacture of shawls. His mother, Jane née Richardson, died when he was one year old, in 1830. He did not have a university education. When he was 15 years he was apprenticed to a metal works, Edmundson & Co, in Capel Street, Dublin, The company was founded and operated by his cousin, Joshua Edmundson. They dealt in ironmongery, ran a brass foundry, and carried out tin plate working and japanning (metal paintwork). At this time, Caple Street was the center of furniture manufactureing. Edmundsons provided metal pieces such as hinges and handles to the furniture makers. After John joined, they also provided gas generation plants. On 26 January 1848, Joshua died of typhus, which he contracted whilst providing relief within soup kitchens during the Great Famine.

Though John was only 19 years old, he took over operation of the company and provided for his sister and her children. His sister Eliza Wigham became a leading citizen of Edinburgh leading campaigns for women's rights and abolitionist.

Despite his relative youth and limited education, Wigham proved to be a very successful businessman. He concentrated on the provision of more efficient gas-plants of his own design, and Edmundson & Co prospered.

Wigham's relatives, in Scotland, were involved in shipbuilding, and he developed an interest in lighting used as a navigational aid at sea. Initially, buoys only had bells to warn mariners at night: the difficulty lay in designing an oil-lamp which could burn while unattended and not be extinguished by waves and storms. The first successful lighted buoy was patented by Wigham in 1861. It was installed in the river Clyde.

On 4 August 1855, Wigham married Mary Pim, daughter of Irish businessman and MP Jonathan Pim. They had 10 children.

== Work on lighthouse illumination ==
In 1863 Wigham was given a grant by the Dublin Ballast Board to develop a system for gas illumination of lighthouses. In 1865 the Baily Lighthouse at Howth Head was fitted with Wigham's new gas 'crocus' burner (Note: The 'crocus' burner was important in that it established the superiority of gas over oil, however Wigham replaced the 'crocus' design with his 'composite' burner) this design was, which was 4 times more powerful than equivalent oil lights. An improved 'composite' design, installed in the Baily light in 1868, was 13 times more powerful than the most brilliant light then known, according to the scientist John Tyndall, an advisor to the United Kingdom's lighthouse authority, Trinity House.

In 1870, the light at Wicklow Head was fitted with Wigham's patent intermittent flashing mechanism, which timed the gas supply by means of clockwork. When this mechanism was combined with a revolving lens in Rockabill Lighthouse, the world's first lighthouse with a group-flashing characteristic was produced.

Wigham had a long-standing rivalry with the Engineer-in-Chief of Trinity House, James Nicholas Douglass, which erupted over trials of rival gas, oil and electric illumination systems conducted at South Foreland Lighthouse, Dover, in 1884–5. Tyndall, still acting as a scientific consultant, accused Douglass of using his position to influence the trials' outcome and ensure the adoption of his own patents over those of Wigham. Wigham also stated that Douglass had used elements of one of his rejected designs. As a result of the dispute, Tyndall resigned, while Wigham was eventually paid £2500 by the Board of Trade for patent infringement.

== Other inventions and later life ==
Wigham made many other inventions, largely in the area of maritime safety. He invented new oil-lamps, gas-lights and electric-lights, gas-powered fog signals, buoys, petroleum-fuelled buoy lights and acetylene lighting equipment. He was working on new electric illumination systems at the time of his death in 1906. Lights supplied by Edmundson & Co. were used in lighthouses all over the globe; the firm still exists as F. Barrett & Co. of Dublin.

Wigham was also director and vice-chairman of the Dublin United Tramways Company, and latterly president of the Dublin Chamber of Commerce. An advocate of temperance, he twice turned down a knighthood due to his religious beliefs.

He is buried in the Friends Burial Ground (Quaker cemetery) at Blackrock, Dublin.
