= Richard Brocklesby =

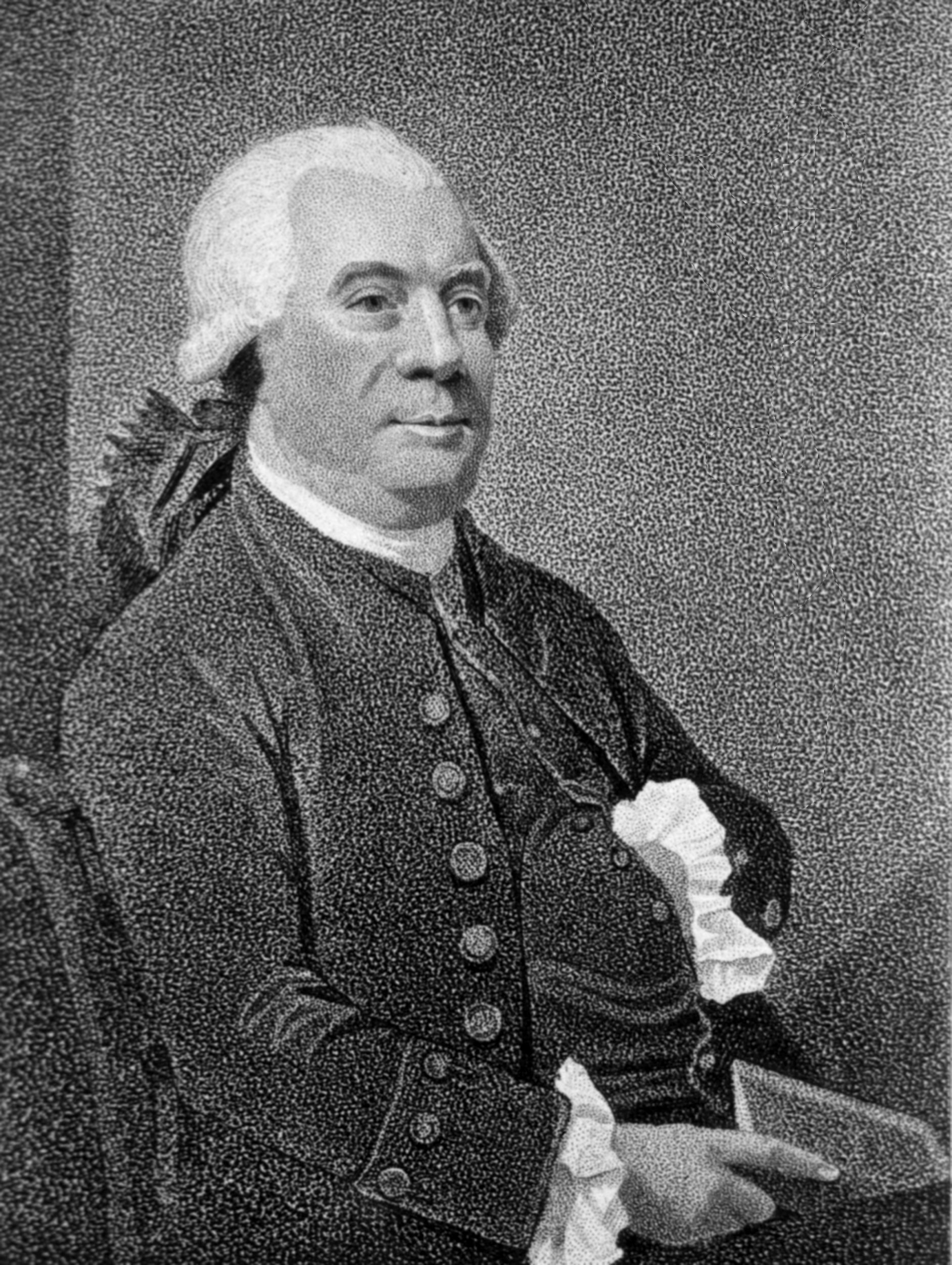
Richard Brocklesby

Richard Brocklesby (11 August 1722 – 11 December 1797), an English physician, was born at Minehead, Somerset.

He was educated at Ballitore, in Ireland, where Edmund Burke was one of his school fellows, studied medicine at Edinburgh, and finally graduated at Leiden in 1745. He succeeded John Pringle as Surgeon General of the British Army in 1758, and served in Germany during part of the Seven Years' War, and on his return settled down to practice in London. He was admitted a fellow of the Royal College of Physicians and in 1758 delivered their Goulstonian Lectures, in 1763 their Croonian Lecture and in 1760 the Harveian Oratory. In 1764 he published Œconomical and Medical Observations, which contained suggestions for improving the hygiene of army hospitals. In his latter years he withdrew altogether into private life. He was elected a Fellow of the Royal Society in 1757.

He was on the premises of the House of Lords when he attended the Earl of Chatham following the latter's ultimately fatal collapse while speaking at a debate in the House on the American War of Independence in April 1778.

The circle of his friends included some of the most distinguished literary men of the age. He was warmly attached to Dr. Samuel Johnson, to whom about 1784 he offered an annuity of £100 for life, and whom he attended on his deathbed, while in 1788 he presented Burke, of whom he was an intimate friend, with £1000, and offered to repeat the gift every year "until your merit is rewarded as it ought to be at court."

He died on 11 December 1797 aged 75, leaving his house and part of his fortune to his grandnephew, Dr. Thomas Young. He was buried at St Clement Danes’ Church in Westminster.
