= Friends Burial Ground, Dublin =

Cemetery in Dublin, Ireland

Coordinates: 53.295351°N 6.171705°W

Friends Burial Ground
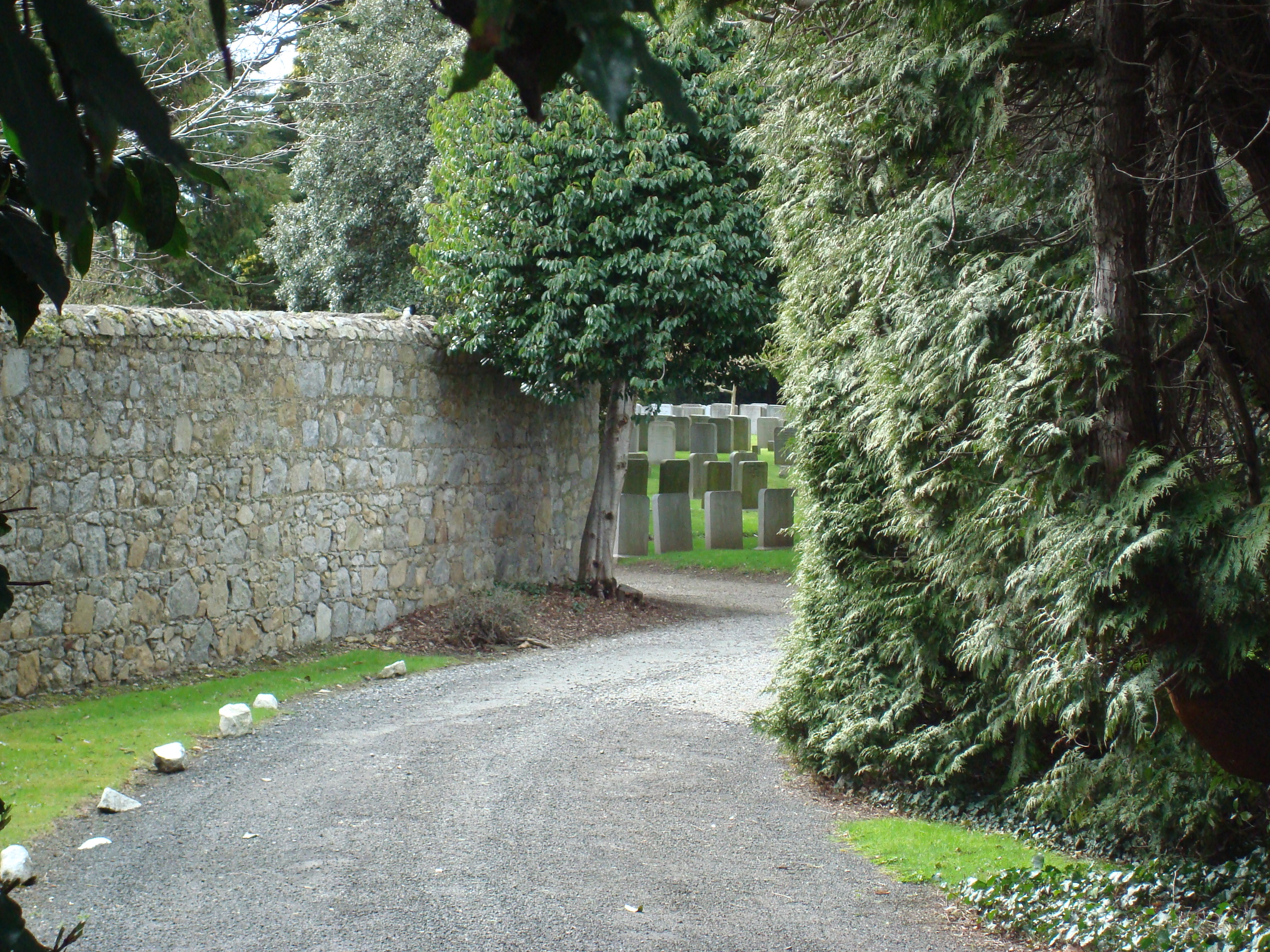
- Interactive map of Friends Burial Ground

Details
- Established: 1860
- Location: Temple Hill, Blackrock, Dún Laoghaire–Rathdown
- Country: Ireland
- Type: Quaker
- Style: Garden cemetery
- Size: 2.35 ha (5.8 acres)

The Friends Burial Ground (Irish: Reilig Chumann na gCairde), also called Temple Hill Burial Ground or the Friends Sleeping Place is a Quaker burial ground located at Temple Hill, Blackrock, Dublin. It opened in 1860 and is one of two Quaker burial grounds in Dublin, the other being at Cork Street.

== History ==
Before this burial ground opened, there were two other burial grounds in Dublin. One in Cork Street and the other located off St. Stephen's Green on York Street. The ground on York Street was sold in 1805 for the building of the Royal College of Surgeons. Today there is nothing to be seen of this old burial ground. The Cork Street burial ground, which dates from the 1690s, is located beside the James Weir Home for Nurses, opposite the old Cork Street Fever Hospital.

The Friends Burial Ground at Temple Hill is 5.8 acres (2.3 ha) in size and opened with the first interment on 6 March 1860 of Hannah Chapman. All the gravestones in the burial ground are uniform in size and are inscribed with only the names and dates of who they are for. This is in keeping with the Quaker rules for interment.

It is noted that some of the Quaker families interred here are Allen, Grubb, Fairbrother, Goodbody, Haughton, Pim, Todhunter, Sparrow Walpole and Waring. The burial grounds are under the care of the Dublin Monthly Meeting of the Religious Society of Friends in Ireland.

== Notable burials ==
- Sir John Barrington (1824–1887), Lord Mayor of Dublin in 1865 and 1879
- Anna Haslam (1829–1922), women's rights activist
- Jonathan Pim (1806–1885), founding member and president of the Dublin Statistical Society
- Lydia Shackleton (1828–1914), Irish botanical artist
- Horace Walpole (1880–1964), damask and linen manufacturer
- Alfred Webb (1834–1908), Irish Parliamentary Party politician, Member of Parliament, biographer and publisher
- Maria Webb (1804–1873), Irish philanthropist, writer on religious and Quaker history.
- John Richardson Wigham (1829–1906), lighthouse engineer and inventor

There is a small Quaker burial ground in the heart of Dublin. Right beside the Shelbourne Hotel on Saint Stephen’s Green. There used to be another on Peter Street behind the National Archive building but the remains were moved to Mount Jerome graveyard in Harold’s Cross. Maria Webb (1804–1873), Irish philanthropist, writer on religious and Quaker history is buried there.
