= Maria Webb =

Irish philanthropist

Maria Webb (née Lamb; 6 August 1804 – 8 January 1873) was an Irish philanthropist, as well as a writer on religious and Quaker history.

She was born to the Quaker family of Dorothy née Wright and her husband Thomas Lamb at Peartree Hill, near Lisburn, Belfast. She married William Webb on 21 August 1828, setting up home in Belfast where the couple had eleven children.

Her philanthropic work starts with the creation of the Servants' Friend Society, a charitable organisation which exhorted servants, by offering rewards, to remain with their employers for the long-term. She was active in the Belfast Ladies' Anti-Slavery Society, and was one of the founders in 1847 of the Belfast Ladies' Industrial National School for Girls.

The Webb family relocated to Dublin in 1848 where in 1857 she published Annotations on Dr D'Aubigné's Sketch of the Early British Church, which argued for the importance of the Irish in the development of the early church in the British Isles. She next published The Fells of Swarthmoor Hall and their friends... (1865) and The Penns and the Peningtons of the seventeenth century... (1867), both histories of the early years of the Society of Friends and personalities such as Margaret Fell, Isaac Penington, William Penn, and Thomas Ellwood. The Oxford Dictionary of National Biography notes that both books were well-received and "showed the common tendency among mid-Victorian women historians to explore social, religious, and political history through the biography of an individual or a family history".

Maria Webb died at Rathmines, Dublin and is buried in the Quaker Temple Hill Burial Ground, Blackrock, Dublin.

== Works ==
- Annotations on Dr D'Aubigné's Sketch of the Early British Church (1857)
- The Fells of Swarthmoor Hall and their friends... (1865)
- The Penns and the Peningtons of the seventeenth century... (1867)
- Scrapbook of Maria Webb (1840 - 1890), collection of letters from leading abolitionists, including Frederick Douglass and Harriet Beecher Stowe
