= Job Scott =

- Born: October 18, 1751; Providence, Rhode Island
- Died: November 22, 1793 (aged 42); Ballitore, Ireland
- Occupations: Teacher, Tutor
- Known for: Traveling Quaker minister
- Spouse: Eunice Anthony (July 8, 1760 - July 5, 1791) married 1780
- Children: 6

Job Scott (October 18, 1751 in Providence, Rhode Island – November 22, 1793 in Ballitore, Ireland) was an eminent traveling minister in the Religious Society of Friends and a prominent American quietist. His religious philosophy had a deep, shaping influence that contributed to the first schism in American Quakerism, the 1827 Hicksite-Orthodox split.

== Biography ==
Scott's parents were John and Lydia Scott. As a young man he indulged in 'music, gaming and pleasure' but at the age of 19, by 'illumination and openings of divine light in my mind' he became a devout Christian, finding unity of sentiment and principle among the Society of Friends. He attended Smithfield Meeting House.

In 1773, Scott boarded at Elmgrove, the home of Moses Brown, the co-founder of Brown University. Scott taught school in the Quaker meeting house in Providence and tutored Brown's children. Through Scott's friendship and example, Moses Brown became a Quaker in 1774.

Scott moved to Springfield, Massachusetts, during the American Revolution and became a recognized traveling minister, sponsored in his work by Brown. He traveled widely from Vermont to Georgia in his ministry and visited the Nicholite communities, the 'New Quakers', in Maryland and North Carolina in 1789 and 1790.

During the Revolutionary War, Scott was an active war tax resister.

== Doctrinal views ==
Job Scott was a respected and well-beloved minister among Quakers in America, with views consistent with those of the early Society of Friends. He was known for his total dependence upon the immediate moving and empowering of the Holy Spirit, and his unwillingness to minister without a clear sense of the Lord's will. On occasions, while preaching, he would suddenly stop speaking and sit down, explaining later that, having lost a sense of the authority and direction of the Spirit of God, he could do nothing without it.

It is sometimes wrongly asserted that Scott's deep convictions about the inward and spiritual nature of true Christianity, and his dependence upon the immediate movings of the Spirit for all worship and ministry, somehow contributed to the unorthodox views of Elias Hicks and his followers, and the subsequent separation in the Society in 1827. It is true that some Hicksite preachers highly regarded the writings of Scott, but this is equally (if not more) true of a great many orthodox Friends, who never departed from the principles and practices of early Friends. Unlike Hicks, Job Scott strongly believed in the deity of Jesus Christ, saying upon his deathbed "I as firmly believe in the divinity of Christ, as any man living", and also maintained (with all orthodox Quakers) an unshaken believe that "all Scripture is given by inspiration of God, and is profitable for doctrine, for reproof, for correction, and for instruction in righteousness."

During his voyage across the Atlantic to visit the meetings of Friends in England and Ireland, Scott wrote a short treatise called "Essays on Salvation by Christ" in which he made some unusual statements comparing the soul of a Christian to a "mother", in which the Seed of the Father (Christ) is planted in order to bring forth fruit to the Sower - Christ formed within. These comments later came under scrutiny by certain members of the Society of Friends, and his essays were thought best to be kept unpublished at a time when the Society was already struggling with the spread of unsound principles. There is, in fact, good reason to doubt whether Scott would have ever desired their publication; for, while dying from smallpox in Ireland in 1792, Job Scott made the following remarks about his essays on salvation: "On the ocean I wrote over about a quire of paper, which I believe is now in my trunk, at John Elliott's, which I was ever a good deal doubtful whether some parts of it were not more in a way of abstruse reasoning, than might be best for a Friend to publish. Be that as it may, I am very apprehensive, that most of my writings are far from properly digested, and some of them, I believe, might be a good deal better guarded. Our views of things do not usually open all at once; it is so in the individual, it is so in the world."

== Ministry in Great Britain ==
Scott's wife, Eunice, died in 1791 and he was subsequently prompted to travel with his ministry to Europe. On December 5, 1792, Scott left Boston for Dunkirk, France, arriving on January 5, 1793. From there he went on to England visiting Quaker meetings in Kent, London, Bristol and Carmarthen in Wales before leaving for Ireland from Liverpool. In Ireland, he fell ill with smallpox and after a short illness he died at the home of the Quaker Elizabeth Shackleton at Ballitore, Ireland, on November 22, 1793. He was buried at the Friends Burial Ground there on November 24, 1793.

== Legacy ==
Scott was the last major American Quaker to equally represent the dual spiritual threads in Quakerism, those of the Inward Light and Scripture, before the 1827 Hicksite-Orthodox split at Philadelphia Yearly Meeting.

His Journal of the Life, Travels, and Gospel Labors of That Faithful Servant and Minister of Christ, Job Scott, was first published in an abridged form in 1797, with most of the controversial doctrinal material removed. However, this material was already in circulation and influential among Quakers before being eventually published in 1824 when it became part of the debate as the doctrinal antagonisms within American Quakerism approached division.

Scott's complete writings, The Works of that Eminent Minister of the Gospel, Job Scott, were published in 1831 by the Hicksites, who had by then come to regard him as a prophet.
