= Phonsie O'Brien =

Irish jockey and racehorse trainer

- O'Brien in 2008

Personal information
- Nationality: Irish
- Born: 15 Sep 1929 Churchtown, County Cork, Ireland
- Died: 5 July 2016 (aged 86) Kilsheelan, Ireland
- Occupation: Horse trainer

Horse racing career
- Sport: Horse racing

Alphonsus Septimus 'Phonsie' O'Brien (15 Sep 1929 – 5 July 2016) was an Irish jockey and racehorse trainer.

He was the youngest of a combined seven sons born in Churchtown, County Cork to the two marriages of Dan O'Brien, and full-brother of racehorse trainer Vincent O'Brien. He had a riding career in the 1940s which he followed by taking out a licence to train horses in 1956. He was based in stables at South Lodge, Carrick-on-Suir and later at Cashel. He trained the winner of the Galway Plate four times in succession from 1962 to 1965 and was credited with Chamour's victory in the 1960 Irish Derby. Vincent O'Brien had trained Chamour but was suspended from training after the horse failed a drugs test. Phonsie O'Brien took over the training licence while his brother was suspended.

O'Brien's daughter, Mary Ann O'Brien, is a businesswoman who founded the Lily O'Brien's chocolate company.

O'Brien died at his home near Kilsheelan on 5 July 2016.
