= Ballitore =

Village in County Kildare, Ireland

Ballitore Béal Átha an Tuair
- Village
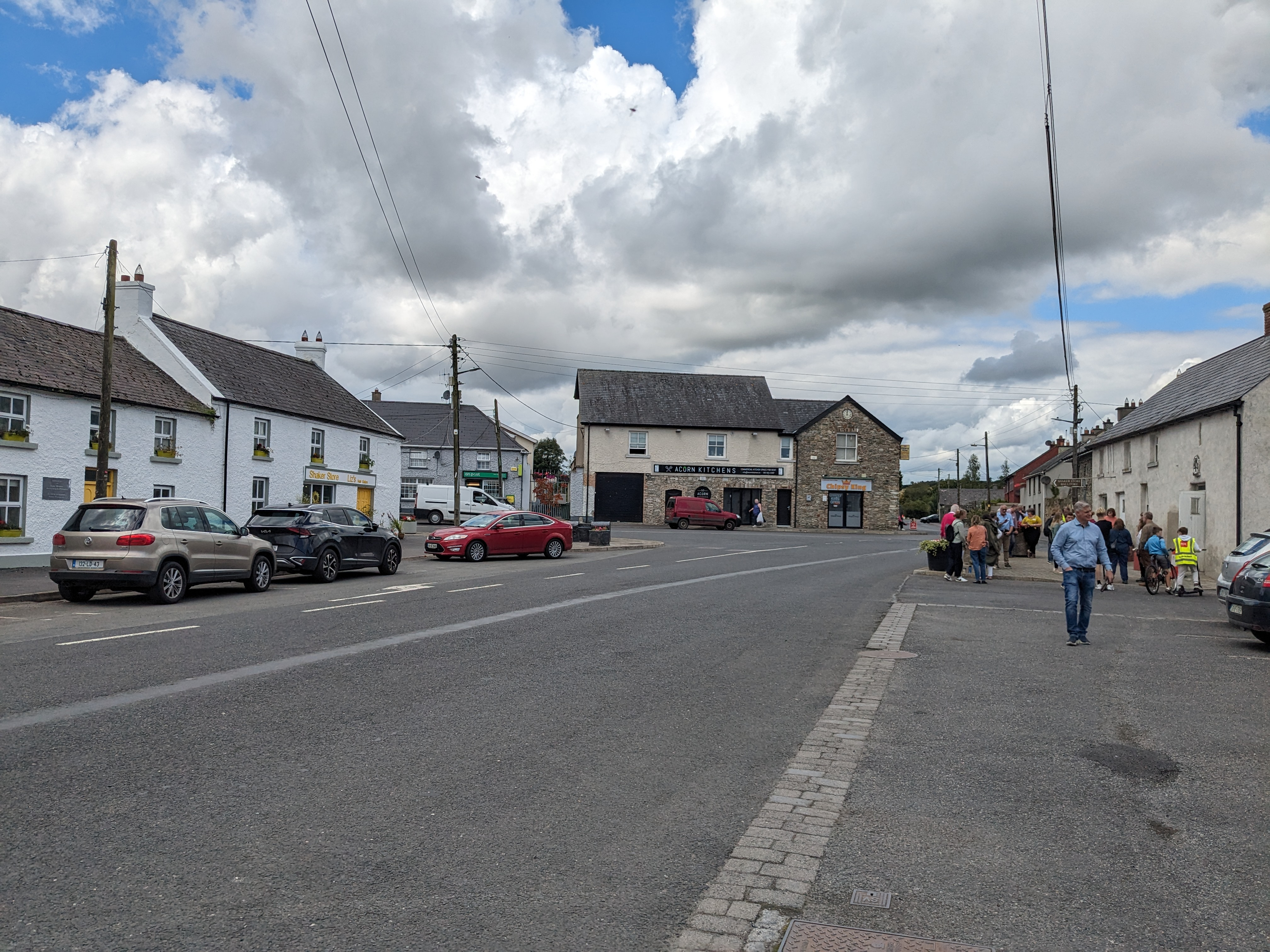
- Ballitore Village Square as seen from the Mary Leadbeater House

- Location in Ireland
- Coordinates: 53°00′31″N 6°49′05″W
- Country: Ireland
- Province: Leinster
- County: Kildare

Population (2016)
  - Total: 793
- Time zone: UTC+0 (WET)
  - Summer (DST): UTC-1 (IST (WEST))
- Irish Grid Reference: S796955

Historical population
Year	Pop.	±%
1841	441	—
1851	417	−5.4%
1861	421	+1.0%
1871	446	+5.9%
1881	412	−7.6%
1891	390	−5.3%
1901	309	−20.8%
1911	307	−0.6%
1926	181	−41.0%
1936	219	+21.0%
1946	178	−18.7%
1951	174	−2.2%
1956	335	+92.5%
1961	269	−19.7%
1966	256	−4.8%
1981	287	+12.1%
1986	290	+1.0%
1991	293	+1.0%
1996	295	+0.7%
2002	338	+14.6%
2006	445	+31.7%
2011	685	+53.9%
2016	793	+15.8%

Ballitore (Irish: Béal Átha an Tuair) is a village in County Kildare, Ireland, sometimes spelt as Ballytore. It is noted for its historical Quaker associations. It was the first planned Quaker village in either England or Ireland - and remains the only one in Europe.

== History ==
Ballitore was first developed and founded as a Quaker settlement by John Bancroft and Abel Strettel. They developed the farmland in the area around Ballitore, and built wool and flour mills and help to develop the settlement. A quaker meeting house was built in c. 1707. During the 1798 Rebellion, the village was plundered and burned and some of its inhabitants were killed.

The Quaker school in the village was founded by Abraham Shackleton who was previously a schoolmaster in Yorkshire in 1726. The school catered for Quakers from other parts of Ireland as well as both Protestant and local Catholic children. Parliamentarian Edmund Burke, a student at Shackleton's school from 1741 to 1744, described Shackleton as "the planter of the future age". The Quaker school in Ballitore was founded and run by the Shackleton family and kept within the family for three generations. It was the most successful Quaker private boarding school in Ireland throughout the 18th and 19th centuries. The school was the only one in Ireland which provided more than just elementary-level education. It offered modern languages in the 1780s. It held between 50 and 60 pupils ranging greatly in age. It was a well-regarded boarding school, with Napper Tandy, Cardinal Paul Cullen, and the sons of Stratford Eyre among its students. In 2013, the Quaker school was demolished in order to make way for a Glanbia development in the centre of the town. The 18th-century building had been a listed building up until 2011 and was on the Record of Protected Structures (RPS). However, in 2012 Kildare County Council decided to delist it.

Mary Leadbeater, the daughter of Richard Shackleton and granddaughter of Abraham Shackleton, was a poet and a writer who lived in Ballitore. She wrote of her first-hand experiences during the 1798 rebellion. Mary Leadbeater's house is situated on the corner of Ballitore's central village square, and is a preserved building and is now used as a museum and library.

In April 1920, during the War of Independence, the RIC barracks in Ballitore was burned in an arson attack. Throughout the Civil War, several of the homes and buildings in Ballitore and the surrounding areas were damaged and raided for goods and money. Ballitore House which was built on the site of an older house built by the Shackleton family c. 1700 was burned in April 1923 by Anti-Treaty forces.

== Demographics ==
In the 2002 census, Ballitore had a population of 338, increasing to 793 by the time of the 2016 census. In 1837 the population was 933.

== Historic buildings and places ==
=== Ballitore House ===
Ballitore House, situated on Fuller's Court Road, was once the home of the Strettels, the family of Abel, one of Ballitore's founders. A wood was originally planted next to the house to enhance its beauty. The house was burnt down by the IRA in 1922, leaving only the original walls, but was restored again in 1926. only to fall into disuse again.

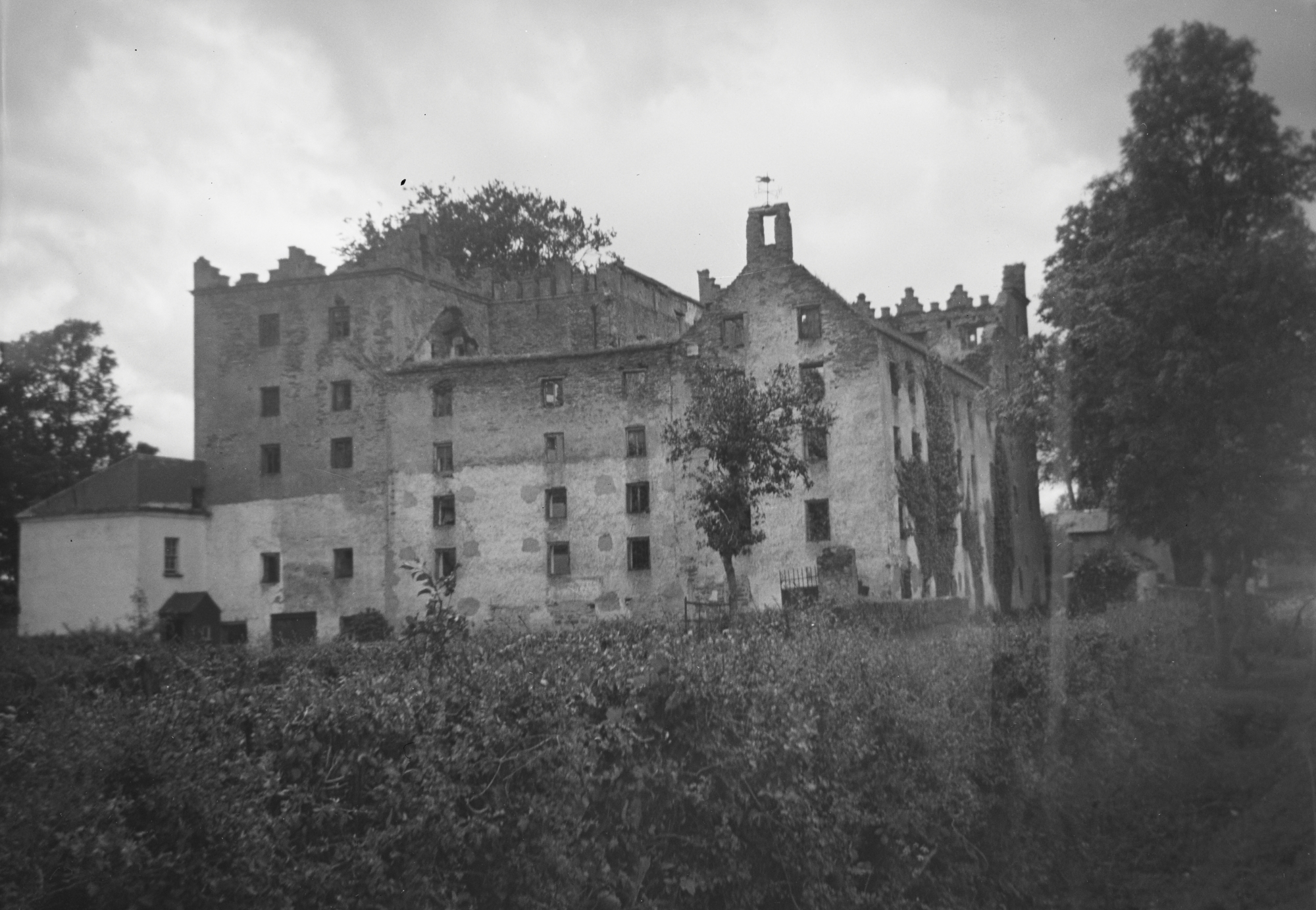
Ballitore Mills

=== Ballitore Mill ===
Originally a woollen mill, Ballitore Mill was later adapted for use as a corn mill, while flour was also milled widely including in the nearby village Crookstown less than one kilometre away.

=== Fuller's Court ===
Built in 1720, Fuller's Court is the early home of the writer Mary Shackleton (later known as Mary Leadbeater) who was born here in 1758. The granddaughter of Abraham Shackleton, she was a pioneering educator whose pupils included Edmund Burke, Napper Tandy and Paul Cullen (who later became Ireland's first cardinal). She married William Leadbeater in 1791 and became Ballitore's first postmistress.

=== Griesebank House ===
Griesebank House, once known as the Mill House, is a Georgian property dating from about 1700 that has been noted by the National Inventory of Architectural Heritage as being of considerable social and historical importance for its links with the Shackleton family and the development of Ballitore as a Quaker village. It is situated next door to the remains of Ballitore Mill. Like nearby Griesemount House, it is named after the River Greese (also spelt Griese; Irish: An Ghrís) which flows between them, and powered the mill. Set in its own grounds, the house is adjacent to the ruined Ballitore Mill to the southeast. In the early 1990s, Jonathan Irwin and wife Senator Mary Ann O'Brien bought the house and upgraded the house with an adjoining contemporary wing. O'Brien is widely recognised as one of Ireland's early female entrepreneurs, having created the international chocolate brand 'Lily O'Brien's Chocolates' from the kitchen of Griesebank House. During the same period, Irwin set up the Jack and Jill Foundation. In 2015 the house was put on the market.

=== Griesemount House ===
Griesemount House is a period property located close to the village possessing intact Georgian features and layout, and containing four reception rooms and six bedrooms. The scale and fine detailing of the house have been noted by the National Inventory of Architectural Heritage. George Shackleton, a grand-uncle of the Antarctic explorer Ernest, built Griesemount House in 1817 and raised 13 children there, including the noted botanical artist Lydia Shackleton who was the first artist-in-residence at the Botanic Gardens in Dublin. One of Shackleton's first recorded sketches is of the house. In the 'Annals of Ballitore', a diary kept between 1766 and 1823 by local writer Mary Leadbeater, it is described how "on the 22nd day of the sixth month this year, (mid-summer's day) 1817, the first stone of George Shackleton's house at Griesemount was laid by his little niece Hannah White". In the early 1970s, the house passed into the ownership of Sara von Stade, the widow of an American army lieutenant killed in Germany during the Second World War and mother of Frederica von Stade, the world-famous mezzo-soprano singer. Having bought it “for a knockdown price”, von Stade restored and updated the house including enhancement of the gardens. The most recent owners bought the house in 1983 and began operating it as a part-time B&B c. 2003. The house was put up for sale in 2017 with an asking price of €925,000, and again in 2018 for €850,000. In November 2019 the entire contents of the house were put up for auction, following the recent sale of the house.

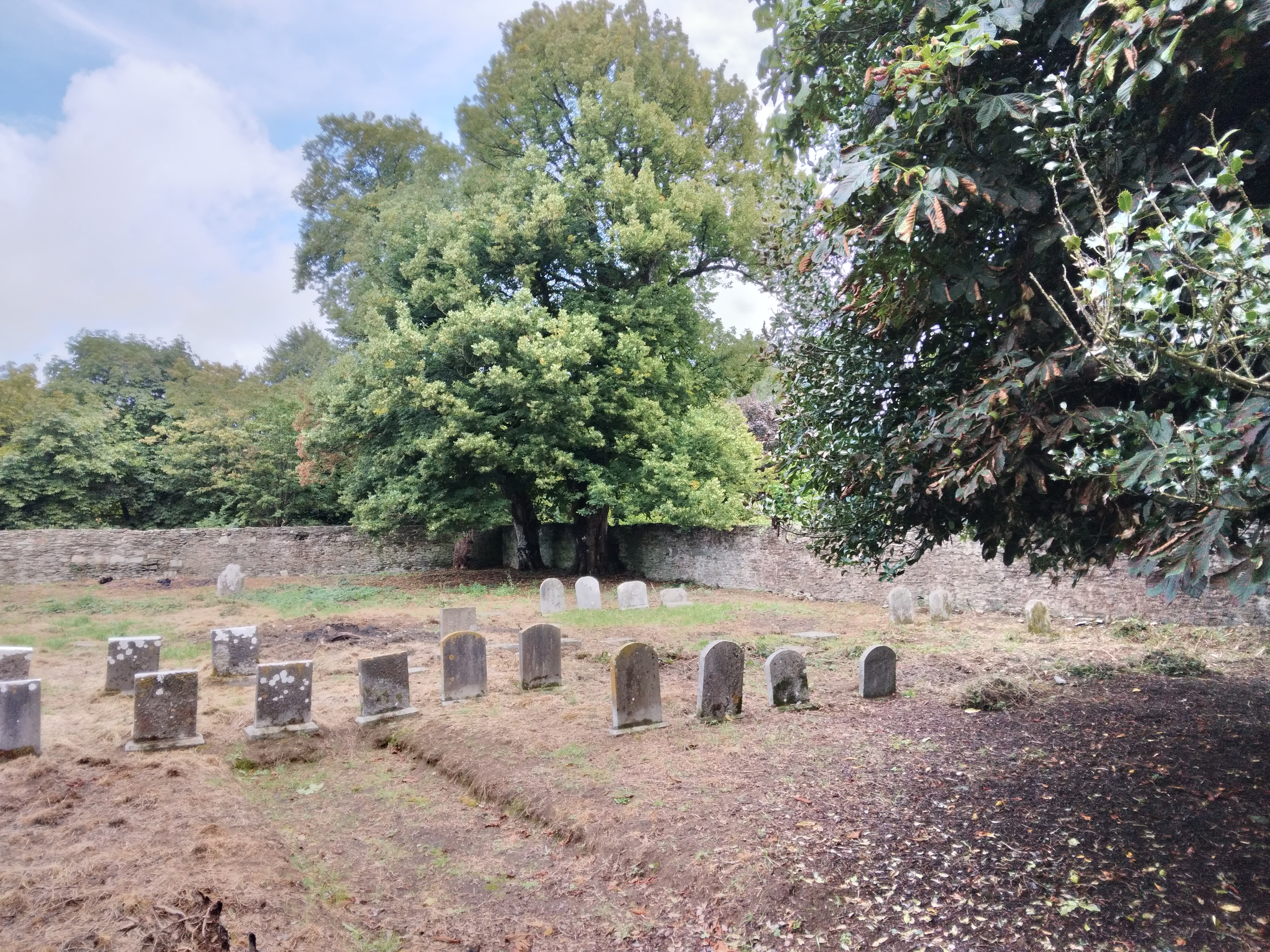
The Quaker graveyard in Ballitore

=== Quaker graveyard ===
Close to the village lies the Quaker graveyard in which Mary Leadbeater and her husband lie side by side. Unusually for an Irish graveyard of the 18th century, there is no church. The yard is enclosed by four stone walls and the graves are simple and uniform; flat slabs announcing names only, with no superfluous messages, as is Quaker tradition. The gravestones are designed to be uniform as, according to Quaker beliefs, all are equal in death.

=== Quaker Meeting House ===
The village's Quaker Meeting House was restored in 1975 by Kildare County Council, and won a European heritage award in 1979. As of 1999, the Meeting House also remained in service as a house of prayer for the local Quaker community, most of whom were noted to have "embraced the religion relatively recently", and who gathered on Sunday mornings.

=== The Leadbeater House ===
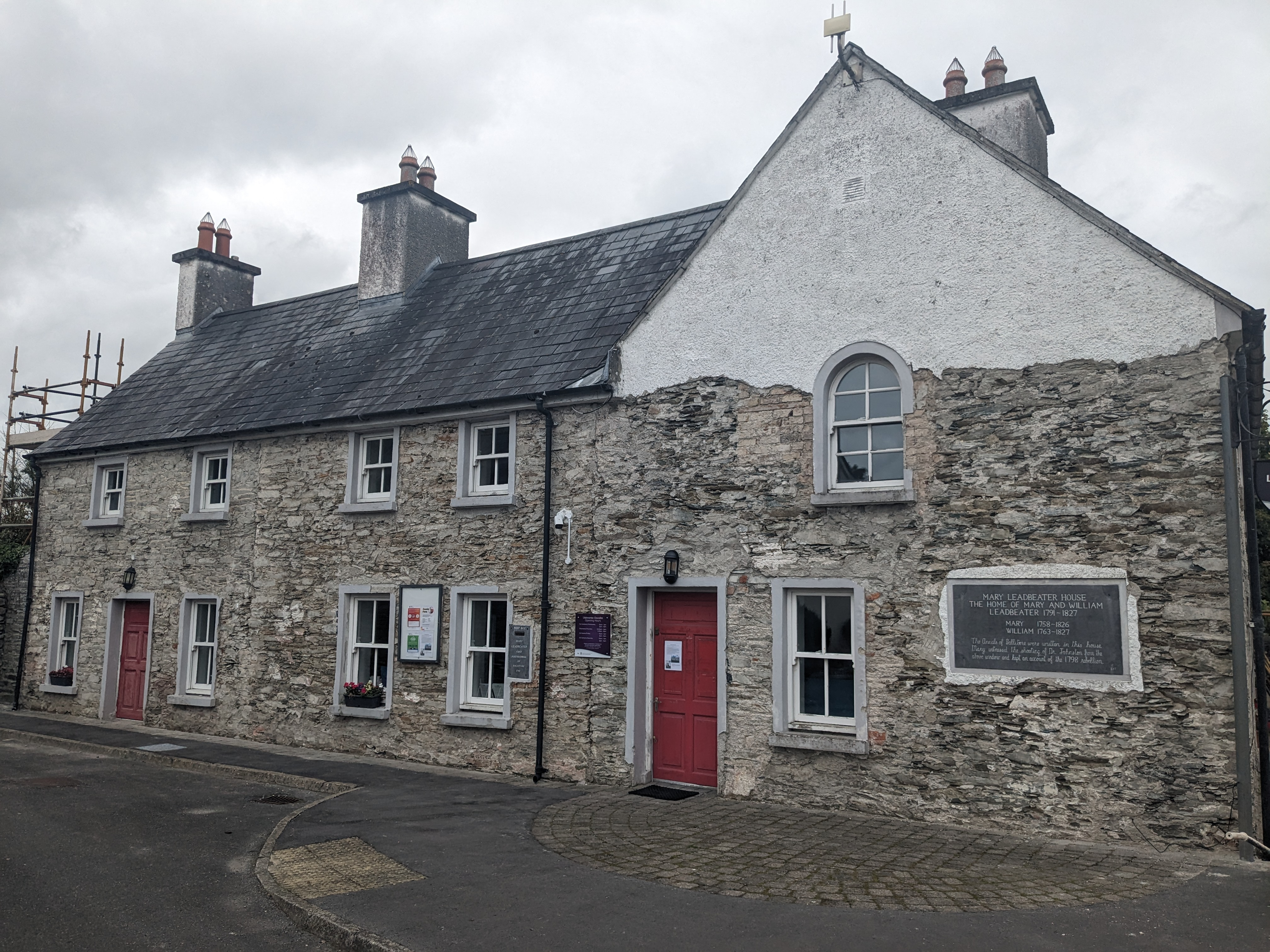
The Mary Leadbeater House

The Mary Leadbeater House now serves as a library and museum set in the village square. Another one of the Leadbeater's houses was built with its gable end facing side-on to the main street and looked onto the village market square. In the late 1990s, the house was restored by a FÁS scheme which won a national award worth £100,000. The meticulously ordered Quaker ethos of discipline and avoidance of excess can be observed in the design of the building with a sequence of lime-washed, small-windowed rooms which open up on each other. The museum includes artefacts from the original Shackleton home in Yorkshire, dating from 1660. The museum also holds items of Quaker interest such as a wedding dress and bonnet worn by Marian Richardson in 1853 and also holds manuscripts and letters from the Shackleton family, as well as watercolours by Mary Shackleton.

=== Shackleton school ===
The Quaker school in Ballitore was founded and run by the Shackleton family, and kept within the family for three generations. It was the most successful Quaker private boarding school in Ireland throughout the 18th and 19th centuries. By 1999 a small house existed on the site with a plaque on the wall in memory of the school. In 2013, the Quaker school was demolished in order to make way for a Glanbia development in the centre of the town.

=== Shaker Store ===
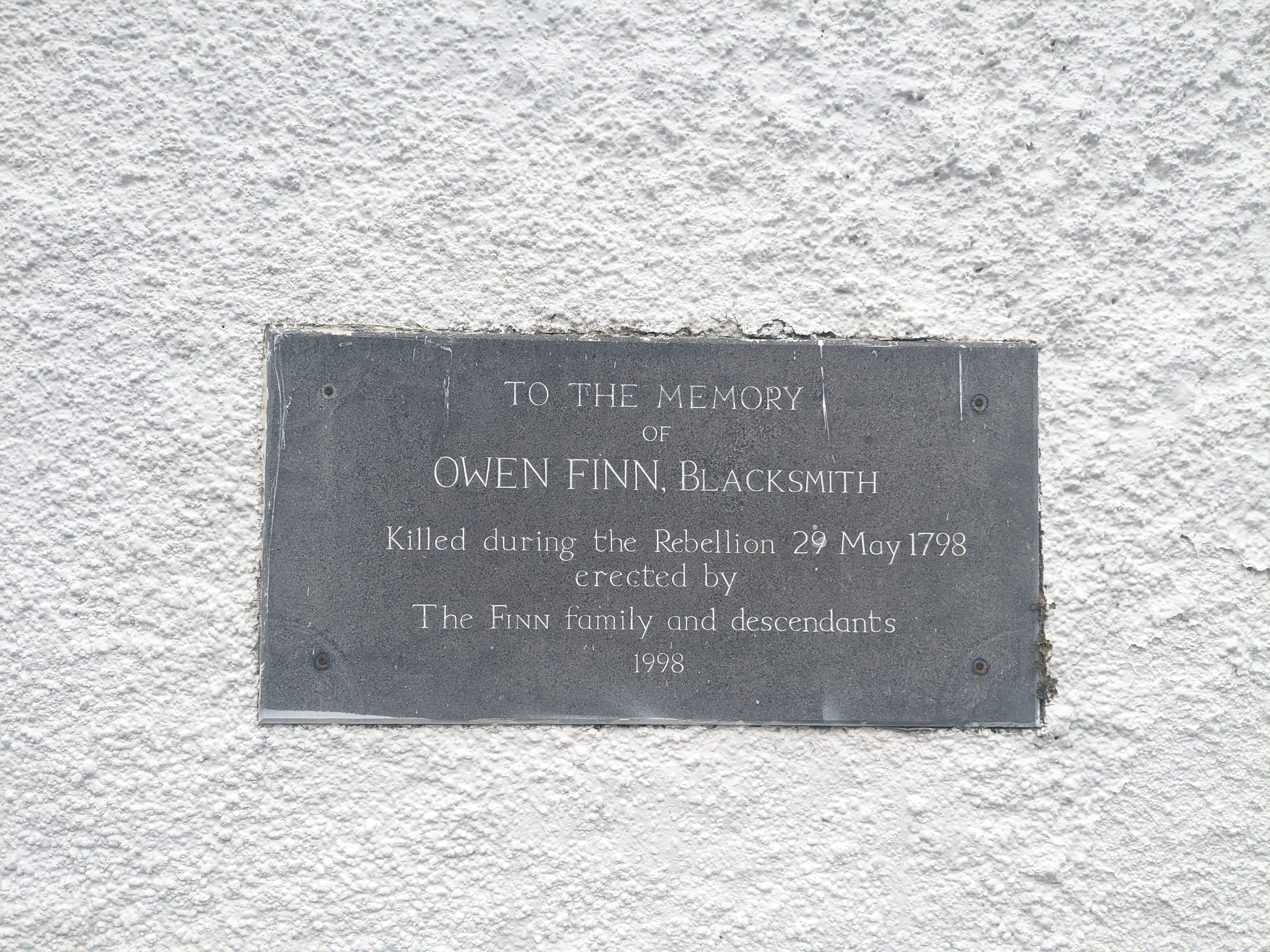
Owen Finn Memorial Inscription

The 'Shaker Store', a workshop which sells Shaker furniture and other wooden gifts, is situated in the main square. The building in which the shop sits, built c.1770, is described in its entry in the National Inventory of Architectural Heritage as an "important component of the architectural heritage of Ballitore, representing the early development of the area as a planned Quaker village". The building was the family home of the Lawlers for several generations and by 1999 the business was operated by Michael Lawler. An ancestor of Michael's named Paddy Dempsey was a leader of the United Irishmen and the first man killed in the Ballitore Rebellion, while another ancestor, Owen Finn, a blacksmith, was also a participant and executed for making pikes. Both individuals are now memorialised by plaques, one on each of the villages two streets.

== Amenities ==
As of August 2022, the village has two pubs; Case's and Butterfield's, known colloquially as 'The Harp'. Butterfield's, a three-bay two-storey house dating to the late 1700s/early 1800s, is of architectural note retaining many important early or original salient features. These include timber sash fenestration, a timber panelled door, a natural slate roof, a vast open-hearth brick fireplace and a cracked flagstone floor. Butterfield's has been noted as being "representative of the unassuming, unrefined architecture of the locality". A third pub, O'Connor's, closed down c. 2015.

As of August 2022, the village has a shop, a post office, a café, a chip shop and the Shaker Store.

== Transport ==
Ballitore is connected to the R448 and R747 regional roads. Ballitore is in south Kildare, on the border with County Wicklow, and is 63 km from Dublin. It is situated between Kilcullen and Castledermot, which is just off the N9.

The village is served by bus route 880 operated by Kildare Local Link on behalf of the National Transport Authority. There are several buses each day including Sunday linking the village to Castledermot, Carlow and Naas as well as villages such as Moone in the area.

== Culture ==
St Laurence's GAA is based in the parish of Narraghmore, encompassing Kilmead, Booley, Narraghmore, Calverstown, Kilgowan, Brewel, Ballymount, Ballitore and Mullaghmast.

Griese Youth Theatre operates in the Quaker meeting house, and have participated in local historical reenactments as well as in National Theatre Connections and with Youth Theatre Ireland.

== People ==
- Richard Brocklesby, English physician, was educated in Ballitore.
- Edmund Burke, Anglo-Irish Parliamentarian, writer and political philosopher, was educated in Ballitore.
- Charles Kendal Bushe, Lord Chief Justice of Ireland, was educated in Ballitore.
- Mary Leadbeater, Irish Quaker, writer and poet.
- Job Scott, American travelling Quaker minister, died here in 1793.
- Lydia Shackleton, botanic artist and Irish Quaker, was born here in 1828.

== See also ==
- List of towns and villages in Ireland
- Market Houses in Ireland
- Moone, a nearby village which has a high cross dating from the 8th century
- Quakers in Ireland
