= Alice Jacob =

Irish botanical illustrator, lace designer, and design teacher

- Born: Alice Jacob; 26 January 1862; New Zealand
- Died: 31 July 1921 (aged 59)
- Known for: botanical illustration and lace design

Alice Jacob (26 January 1862 – 31 July 1921) was an Irish botanical illustrator, lace designer, and design teacher.

== Life ==
Alice Jacob was born in 1862 in New Zealand, to Irish parents. The family returned to Ireland in 1871 to live in Dublin. Her family were Quakers, with her father Anthony Pim Jacob running a temperance hotel at 88 Thomas Street. Jacob went on to attend the Dublin Metropolitan School of Art (DMSA), and was awarded the Gilchrist Trust Scholarship in 1882 and a free studentship in 1888. She died in Dublin on 31 July 1921.

== Artistic career ==
Jacob was a successful and well known artist in her time. She was a prizewinner in Art Industries competition at the Royal Dublin Society Horse Show in 1890. In 1891, the Kyrle Society in London awarded her a prize for a frieze she painted. Her work was featured at the Art de la femme exhibitions in Paris between 1891 and 1893. Jacob designed and painted a set of Belleek porcelain for Dr Perceval Wright, the Professor of Botany at Trinity College Dublin. Her work was selected for by the Hungarian Government in 1898 to be exhibited in the new Museum of Industrial Art in Budapest. Having worked at the Cork School of Art and Rathmines Technical School, Jacob was appointed as the teacher of Design and Ornament at the DMSA in 1898. She collaborated with Reverend F.C. Hayes in the production of illustrations for A handy book of horticulture. An introduction to the theory and practice of gardening. Jacob was primarily a lace designer, supplying numerous linen firms with designs during her career, becoming very established in this field by 1900. Much of this work drew on her botanical studies, with elements incorporated into designs for lace, floral damask, embroidery, crochet, and painted silk. She was a frequent prizewinner in London, and was part of the movement to elevate the position of crafts in the art world.

== Botanical illustration ==
In 1908 she succeeded Lydia Shackleton as artist-in-residence and botanical illustrator at the National Botanic Gardens of Ireland. In particular, she produced illustrations of Sir Frederick Moore's collection of orchids, painting more than 150 such illustrations from 1908 to 1919. Her work was demonstrably different from Shackleton's. Her illustrations were quite scientifically rigorous, depicting the specimen from numerous angles, as well as dissections and enlargements. She studied the Irish language was a member of the Gaelic League, she signed and dated her paintings using Gaelic script.
