= Richard Shackleton =

Irish Quaker, schoolmaster and poet (1726–1792)

- Born: 9 December 1726; Ballitore, County Kildare, Ireland
- Died: 28 August 1792 (aged 65); Mountmellick, Queen's county, Ireland
- Resting place: Ballitore Quaker Burial Ground
- Education: Trinity College Dublin (didn't graduate)
- Occupations: Schoolmaster; poet
- Spouses: Elizabeth Fuller (m. 1749; died 1754); Elizabeth Carleton (m. 1755)
- Children: 8 including, Abraham Shackleton; Mary Leadbeater
- Father: Abraham Shackleton

Richard Shackleton (9 December 1726 – 28 August 1792) was an Irish Quaker, schoolmaster of Ballitore Quaker School and poet.

== Early life and education ==
Shackleton was born on 9 December 1726 in Ballitore, County Kildare to English Quaker parents Abraham Shackleton, the schoolmaster of Ballitore Quaker School, and Margaret Shackleton (née Wilkinson; 1688–1768). Shackleton had at least one sister.

Educated at his father's school, Shackleton was a classmate and friend of Edmund Burke. Around 1745, Shackleton enrolled at Trinity College Dublin (TCD) where he studied Classics and Hebrew. After learning enough to teach at the Ballitore Quaker School, Shackleton left TCD without graduating. (Note: Shackleton is also cited as having graduated.)

== Career ==
Shackleton later began teaching at the Ballitore Quaker School, and succeeded his father as schoolmaster in 1756. As schoolmaster Shackleton taught classics, mathematics, and subjects relating to commerce. Shackleton resigned as schoolmaster in 1779. and was succeeded by his son Abraham Shackleton (1752–1818).

In 1783, Shackleton wrote the poem On Travelling to Coalbrook Dale in the Night-Time for Abiah Darby in both English and Latin. Seven short poems by Shackleton were published posthumously by his daughter Mary Leadbeater in her 1808 work "Poems".

== Personal life ==
On 2 April 1749, Shackleton married Elizabeth Fuller (1726–1754) with whom he had four children. The couple's eldest son was Abraham Shackleton, a schoolmaster, theologian and abolitionist. Fuller died in 1754, nine days after the birth of their son Henry (1754–1756). Shackleton married the Quaker Elizabeth Carleton (1726–1804) on 17 October 1755. The couple had four children, including the author Mary Leadbeater. In 1767, Shackleton inherited a small estate with a farm and mill. Shackleton rented out the mill, whilst his wife Elizabeth Carleton ran the farm.

On 28 August 1792, Shackleton died of a fever in Mountmellick, Queen's county (present-day County Laois) whilst traveling to the Queen's county Quakers' provincial school. Shackleton was buried at the Ballitore Quaker Burial Ground.
