= Mary Leadbeater =

Irish author and diarist (1758–1826)

- Born: Mary Shackleton; December 1758; Ballitore, County Kildare, Ireland
- Died: 27 June 1826 (aged 67); Ballitore, County Kildare, Ireland
- Resting place: Ballitore Quaker Burial Ground
- Occupation: Author
- Spouse: William Leadbeater (m. 1791)
- Children: 6
- Father: Richard Shackleton (father)
- Relatives: Abraham Shackleton (half-brother); Abraham Shackleton (grandfather)
- Writing career
- Period: 1794–1824
- Notable work: The Annals of Ballitore (1862)

Mary Leadbeater (/ˈlɛdˌbɛtər/; December 1758 – 27 June 1826) was an Irish Quaker author and diarist who lived most of her life in the planned Quaker settlement of Ballitore, County Kildare. She wrote and published extensively on both secular and religious topics ranging from translation, poetry, letters, children's literature and biography. Her accounts of the Irish Rebellion of 1798 provide an insight into the effects of the Rebellion on the community in Ballitore.

== Early years and education ==
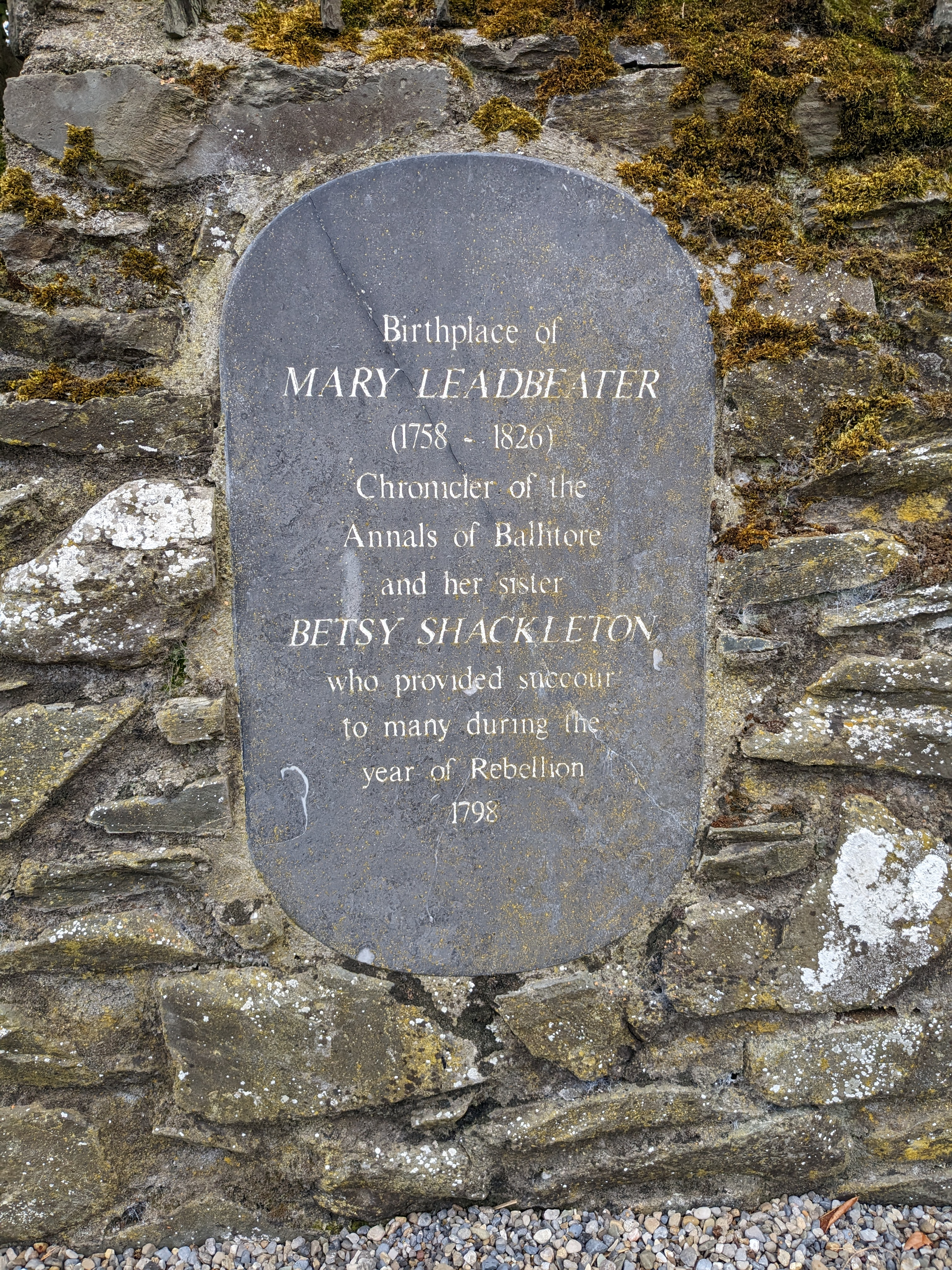
Memorial plaque at the birthplace of Mary Leadbeater

Mary Shackleton was born in Ballitore, County Kildare, Ireland. She was the daughter of Richard Shackleton by his second wife, Elizabeth Carleton (1726–1766), and granddaughter of Abraham Shackleton, schoolmaster of Edmund Burke. Her parents were Quakers. She kept a personal diary for most of her life, beginning at 11 and writing in it almost daily. There 55 extant volumes of her diaries in the National Library of Ireland.

She was educated, and her literary studies were aided by Aldborough Wrightson, a man who had been educated at Ballitore school and had returned to die there. In 1784 she travelled to London with her father and paid several visits to Burke's town house, where she met Sir Joshua Reynolds and George Crabbe. She also went to Beaconsfield, and on her return wrote a poem in praise of the place and its owner, which was acknowledged by Burke, 13 December 1784, in a long letter. On her way home she visited, at Selby, Yorkshire, some primitive Quakers whom she described in her journal.

== Family and married life ==
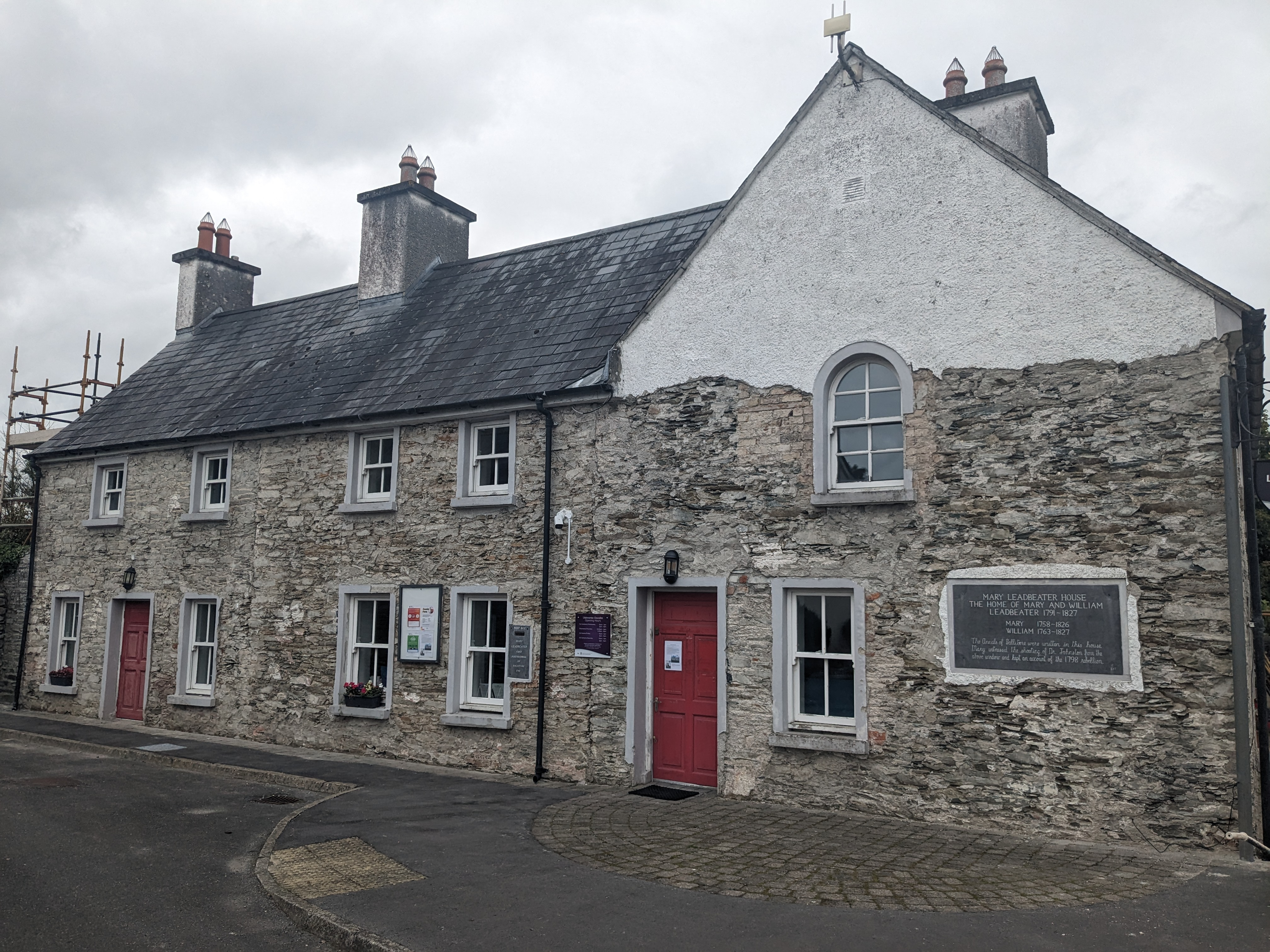
The Ballitore house in which Mary and her husband William lived

On 6 January 1791 she married William Leadbeater, a former pupil of her father and a descendant of the Huguenot Le Batre and Gilliard families. William was orphaned as a young age and was placed in the boarding school ran by Mary's father Richard Shackleton. He converted to Quakerism as an adult and became a prosperous farmer and landowner in Ballitore. Mary spend many years working in the village post office and also worked as a bonnet-maker and a herbal healer for the village. The couple lived in Ballitore and had six children. Their daughter Jane died at a young age from injuries sustained after an accident with a wax taper. Another daughter, Lydia, was a friend and possible patron of the poet and novelist Gerald Griffin.

On her father's death in 1792, Leadbeater received a letter of consolation from Burke. Besides receiving letters from Burke, Leadbeater corresponded with, among others, Maria Edgeworth, George Crabbe, and Melesina Trench. On 28 May 1797 Burke wrote one of his last letters to her.

Leadbeater died at Ballitore on 27 June 1826, and was buried in the Quaker burial-ground there.

== The Rebellion of 1798 ==
Leadbeater described in detail the effects of the 1798 Rebellion on the lives her family and neighbours in Ballitore. She was in Carlow on Christmas Day 1796 attending a Quaker meeting when the news arrived that the French fleet had been seen off Bantry. She described the troops marching out of the town and the ensuing confusion in Carlow and Ballitore.

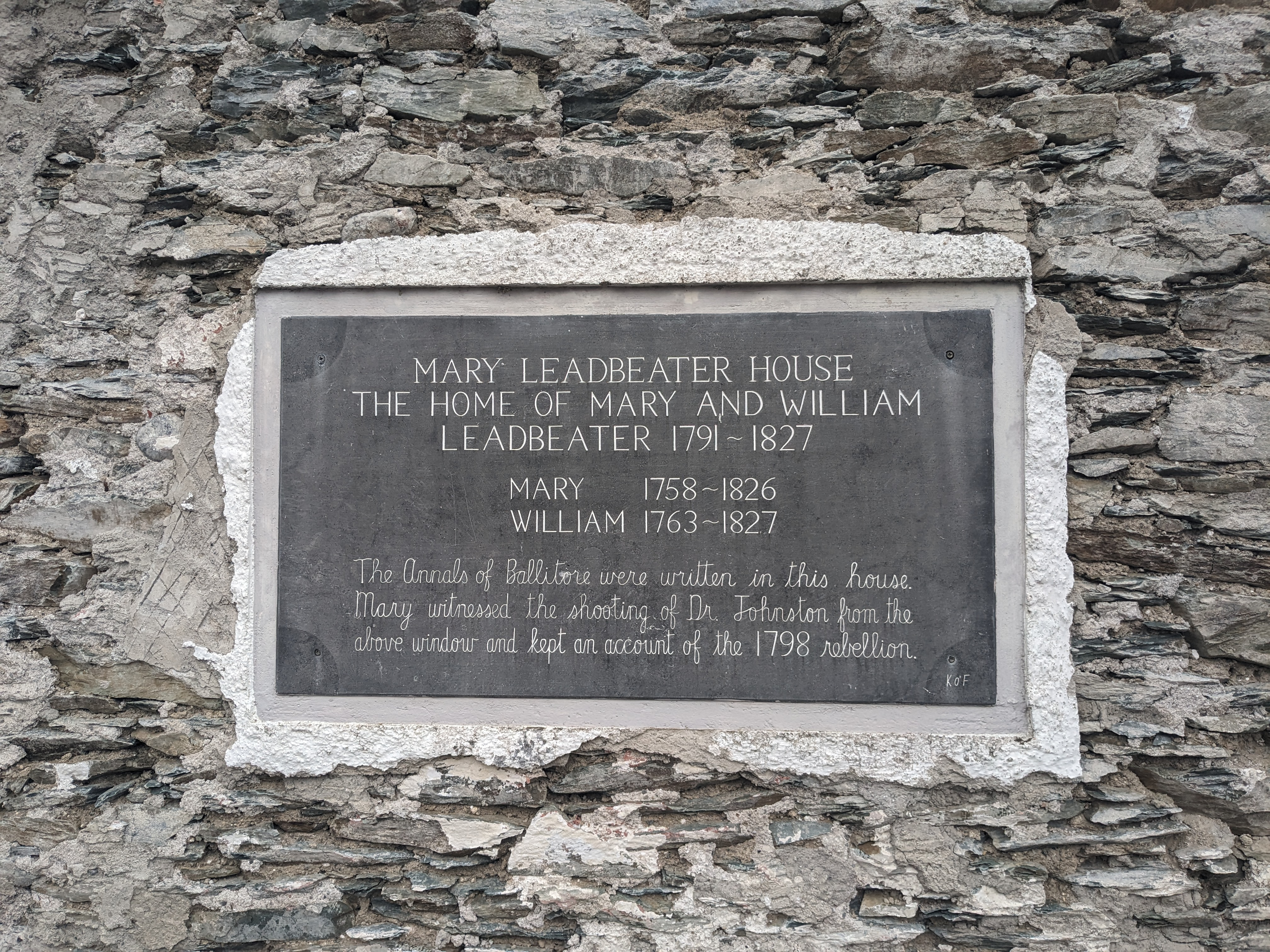
Memorial inscription on the Mary Leadbeater House in Ballitore

Ballitore was occupied in 1798 by yeomanry who were given free quarter in the village. Many of the houses were ransacked in search of weapons and pro-United Irishmen literature. Following an account of the provisions and stock in the village, many of the yeomanry began looting the houses for food and other goods. Soldiers of the Suffolk and Ancient British fencibles came from Athy were also given free quarter in the village. They seized the tools of local blacksmith Owen Finn so as to prevent him from making pikes and other weapons for the United Irishmen. He was later killed. The soldiers tortured and flogged the inhabitants of Ballitore in an attempt to extort confessions about the location of pikes and weapons. Leadbeater described the effects of torture on the inhabitants of Ballitore:

"The torture was excessive, and the victims were long in recovering; and in almost every case it was applied fruitlessly. The Guards were placed at every entrance into the village, to prevent people from entering or leaving it. The village once so peaceful exhibited a scene of tumult and dismay, and the air rang with the shrieks of the sufferers and the lamentations of those who beheld them suffer. These violent measures caused a great many pikes to be brought in: the street was lined with those who came to deliver up the instruments of death."

A force of about 300 rebels armed with pitchforks, pikes, and knives occupied the village following the outbreak of rebellion in the area on 24 May 1798. They were led by Malachi (or Malachy) Delaney, the son of a prosperous Ballitore Catholic farmer. Some members of the insurgency attempted to burn down the meeting-house to punish the Quakers for refusing to take up arms. The rebels carried out reprisals, but fled the following day on the approach of a force of soldiers.

These soldiers in turn exacted reprisals on the locals, killing several inhabitants including the local doctor, Johnston, a childhood friend of Leadbeater. She wrote of the killing of her friend: "He was alone and unarmed when seized, and I believe had never raised his hand to injure any one." The bodies of those killed lay in the streets of Ballitore and nearby fields and ditches for days as their families were unable to bury them due to the danger of being shot or injured themselves. Leadbeater reported that there was no cured bacon sold in Ireland for several months after the rebellion as there was "the well-founded dread of the hogs having fed upon the flesh of men." The soldiers sacked the village and burned many houses. One of them almost killed Mary Leadbeater, who had to flee with a number of other women.

== Published works ==
Leadbeater's first literary work, Extracts and Original Anecdotes for the Improvement of Youth, was published anonymously in 1794 in Dublin. It contains an account of the history of Quakerism and several poems on secular and religious subjects.

In 1808 she published Poems with a metrical version of her husband's prose translation of Maffæus Vegio's Thirteenth Book of the Æneid. There are 67 poems; six are on subjects relating to Burke, one in praise of the spa of Ballitore, and the remainder on domestic and local subjects. She next published in 1811 Cottage Dialogues among the Irish Peasantry, of which four editions, with some alterations and additions, had appeared by 1813. The dialogues are on such subjects as dress, a wake, going to the fair, a spinning match, cow-pock, cookery, and matrimony. William P. Le Fanu had suggested the design, and the object was to diffuse information about the peasantry. In 1813 she tried to instruct the rich on a similar plan in The Landlord's Friend. Intended as a sequel to Cottage Dialogues, in which persons of quality are made to discourse on such topics as beggars, spinning-wheels, and Sunday in the village, Tales for Cottagers, which she brought out in 1814 in conjunction with Elizabeth Shackleton, is a return to the original design. The tales illustrate perseverance, temper, economy, and are followed by a moral play, Honesty is the Best Policy.

In 1822 she concluded this series with Cottage Biography, being a Collection of Lives of the Irish Peasantry. The lives are those of real persons, and contain some interesting passages, especially in the life of James Dunn, a pilgrim to Loch Derg. Many traits of Irish country life appear in these books, and they preserve several of the idioms of the English-speaking inhabitants of the Pale. Memoirs and Letters of Richard and Elizabeth Shackleton … compiled by their Daughter was also issued in 1822 (new edition. 1849, edited by Lydia Ann Barclay). Her Biographical Notices of Members of the Society of Friends who were resident in Ireland appeared in 1823, and is a summary of their spiritual lives, with a scanty narrative of events. Her last work was The Pedlars, a Tale, published in 1824.

Leadbeater's best known work, the Annals of Ballitore, was not printed till 1862, when it was brought out with the general title of The Leadbeater Papers (2 vols.) by Richard Davis Webb, a printer who wanted to preserve a description on rural Irish life. It tells of the inhabitants and events of Ballitore from 1766 to 1823, and few books give a better idea of the character and feelings of Irish cottagers, of the premonitory signs of the rebellion of 1798, and the Rebellion itself. The second volume includes unpublished letters of Burke and the correspondence with Mrs. Richard Trench and with Crabbe.

== Sources ==
- This article incorporates text from a publication now in the public domain: Lee, Sidney, ed. (1892). "Leadbeater, Mary". Dictionary of National Biography. Vol. 32. London: Smith, Elder & Co. This entry lists:
  - Smith, Joseph. A Descriptive Catalogue of Friends' Books
  - Webb, Alfred John (1878). A Compendium of Irish Biography, Dublin:Gill
  - Memoirs of Mrs. Trench
