= Abraham Shackleton =

English schoolmaster in Ireland (1696–1771)

- Born: 27 October 1696; Harden, Yorkshire, England
- Died: 24 June 1771 (aged 74); Ballitore, County Kildare, Ireland
- Resting place: Ballitore Quaker Burial Ground
- Occupation: Schoolmaster
- Children: At least 2, including: Richard Shackleton
- Relatives: Abraham Shackleton (grandson); Mary Leadbeater (granddaughter)

Abraham Shackelton (27 October 1696 – 24 June 1771) was an English Quaker and schoolmaster active in Ballitore, County Kildare. Shackleton's private boarding school, open to people of any faith, educated boys from France, England, and other foreign countries. He taught Edmund Burke, who became a statesman and philosopher, and Paul Cullen, later the Catholic Archbishop of Dublin.

== Early life and education ==
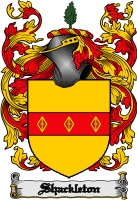
Shackleton Coat of Arms

Shackleton was born on 27 October 1696 at Shackleton House in the village of Harden, Yorkshire to Richard Shackelton (1643–1705), a yeoman farmer, and Sarah Shackelton (née Brigg; 1658–1703). (Note: Shackleton's father is also cited as Abraham Shackleton.) Raised in a Quaker household, the family home became a registered Quaker meeting-house the same year Shackleton was born. The youngest of six children, Shackelton's mother died when he was six and his father when he was eight years old.

He acquired his share of his parents' estate at the age of 20, which he sold to brother Roger (1691–1766) and used the money for his education. He studied Latin and became a good prose stylist.

== Schoolmaster ==
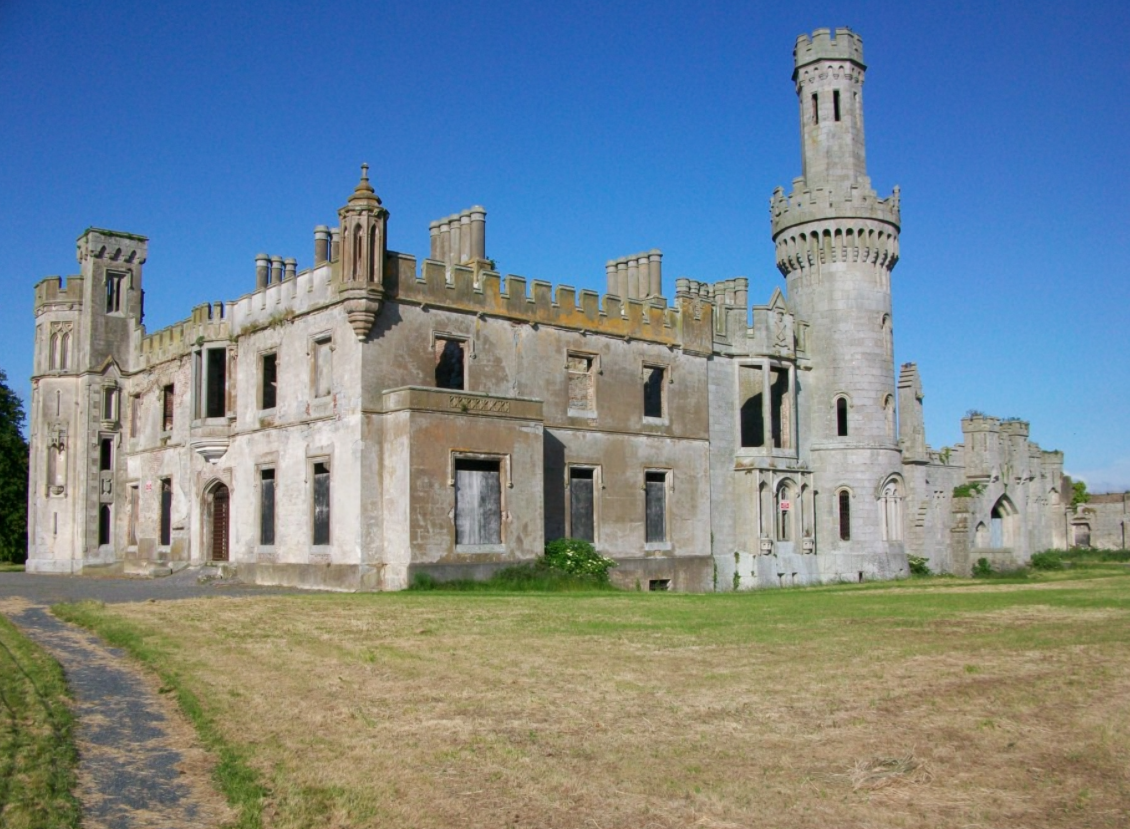
Duckett's Grove, tower side, County Carlow, Ireland

He qualified to become a schoolmaster at the age of 20 when he learned Latin. He worked at David Hall's school at Skipton, North Yorkshire as an assistant. There he met his future wife Margaret Wilkinson, the first cousin of David Hall. He moved to Ireland in 1720, after he was recruited by Irish Quakers to become a tutor for the children of William Cooper and John Duckett. The families resided at Cooper's Hill in Queen's County (now County Laois) and Duckett's Grove in County Carlow, Ireland.

In the neighboring County Kildare, he opened a multi-denominational boarding school at the Quaker village of Ballitore on 1 March 1726. The school took in Irish students, but made the village well known when it attracted students from well-off families in Scotland, England, France, Norway, and Jamaica.

Over 30 years, Shackleton educated more than 500 boys. Statesman and philosopher Edmund Burke and his brothers were among Shackleton's most famous and able students. Burke, who attended the same time as Shackleton's son Richard, claimed that Shackleton was his most influential teacher. Paul Cullen, later the Catholic Archbishop of Dublin, studied under Shackleton.

He was an extremely diligent and careful teacher, strong on fatherly oversight, and always set a good example of uprightness, temperance, and humility. Because of him Quakerism came to be better understood in Ireland and the Quakers admired.

— Peter Lamb, Oxford Dictionary of National Biography

His son Richard took over as the schoolmaster in 1756. Local poor sought shelter, food, and medicine at Shackelton's house. After retiring as a schoolmaster, he farmed in the village and was an active visitor of Quaker meetings throughout Ireland, including Quaker meetings throughout Leinster, and in 1769 he was a representative at the London Yearly Meeting.

== Personal life ==
On 7 October 1725, Shackleton married Margaret Shackleton (née Wilkinson; 1688–1768). The couple had at least two children, including the schoolmaster and poet Richard Shackleton. Shackleton was the grandfather of the author Mary Leadbeater and Abraham Shackleton, a schoolmaster, theologian and abolitionist.

On 24 June 1771, Shackleton died in Ballitore aged 74. Shackleton was buried at Ballitore Quaker Burial Ground. Shackleton's descendants include the Anglo-Irish Antarctic explorer Ernest Shackleton and the Irish botanical artist, teacher, and poet Lydia Shackleton.
