= Jonathan Irwin =

British-Irish bloodstock agent (1941–2023)

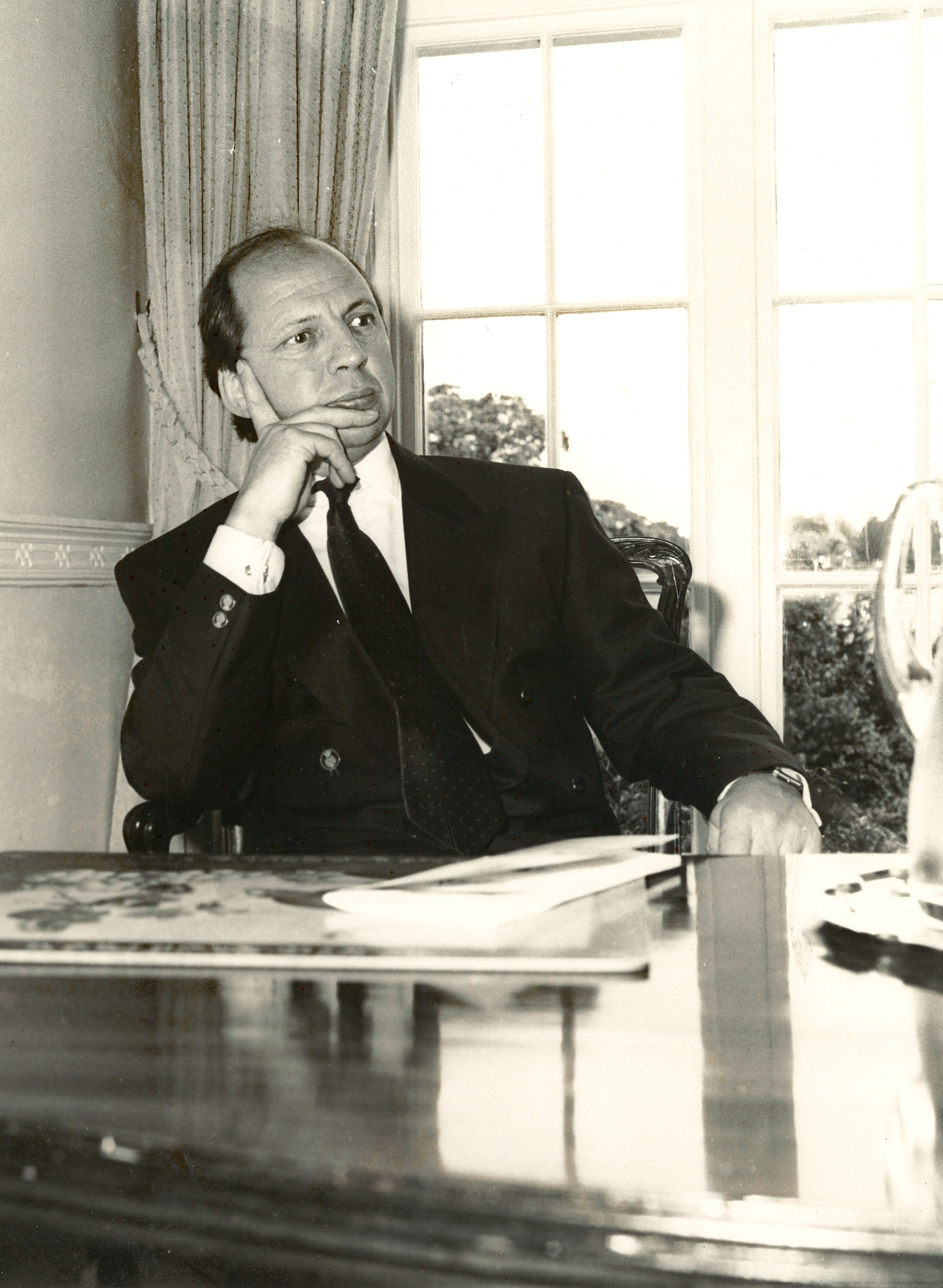
- Irwin in 1987
- Born: 21 June 1941; Malvern, Worcestershire, England
- Died: 10 December 2023 (aged 82)
- Citizenship: Ireland
- Education: Trinity College Dublin
- Spouses: Hon. Mikaela Rawlinson (1964–1989); Mary Ann O'Brien (1991)
- Children: Seven sons (three deceased); two daughters

Jonathan Hiatt Nicolson Dermot Irwin (21 June 1941 – 10 December 2023) was a British-Irish bloodstock agent, auctioneer, stud owner, publisher, racetrack executive and charity founder. In 1997, he founded the Jack and Jill Foundation with his wife Mary Ann O'Brien, to provide home health care to severely sick babies. It was set up as a direct response to the couple's experience of caring at home for their son Jack, born with severe brain damage in 1996.

== Biography ==
=== Early life and education ===
Jonathan Hiatt Nicolson Dermot Irwin was born into an Anglo-Irish family. His father, John Irwin, was an Irish actor, writer and a BBC producer and his mother Philippa Hiatt, was a British stage and screen actress. He spent his early childhood in Coleshill, Buckinghamshire and later in Holland Park, London. He was educated at Eton College, Berkshire, and Trinity College Dublin.

=== Personal life and death ===
On 22 February 1964, he married Mikaela Rawlinson, the eldest daughter of Peter Rawlinson, Baron Rawlinson of Ewell and Rawlinson's first wife, Haidee Rawlinson (née Kavanagh). He and Mikaela had four children.

Irwin divorced Mikaela after which he married Mary Ann O'Brien on 17 March 1991. With Mary Ann O'Brien, he had three sons and two daughters.

Jonathan Irwin died on 10 December 2023, at the age of 82.

== Career ==
=== British Bloodstock Agency ===
Irwin's interest in racing began at Eton where he shared in a school bookmaking team with William Pigott-Brown and Jonathan Sheppard, son of Jockey Club Handicapper Dan Sheppard. By his second term at Trinity, his interest in racing had begun to overshadow his studies, when a friend of his mother's, the ex-Battle of Britain pilot Wing Commander Tim Vigors, asked him to join his Dublin bloodstock agency at IR£5 a week. Vigors and his partner Tom Cooper he singles out as the main influences in his life. "Integrity and a knowledge of the business I learnt from them." When Vigors moved to England, the business was bought out by the British Bloodstock Agency and was subsequently renamed British Bloodstock Agency (Ireland) Ltd, and went on to be one of the leading bloodstock agencies in the country.

By his mid-twenties, Irwin had become the director and remained with the company for fifteen years until 1974. During his time with British Bloodstock Agency (Ireland) Limited, he introduced the Irish Stallion Incentive Scheme which was so successful that it morphed into the European Breeders Fund. He was elected a member of the Irish Turf Club in 1976. Irwin forged a number of international connections and was largely responsible for the development of the highly lucrative Japanese trade in the late 1960s and early 1970s.

=== Irish Horseman magazine ===
Irwin launched the Irish Horseman magazine in the 1960s. With a £100 capital and the floor of his flat in Fitzwilliam Square for offices, he and two friends started the magazine to fill a gap in Irish publishing and, having got it on its feet, he sold out to the Farmer's Journal. The Irish Horseman was a platform to promote the Irish horse and this single aim was the overriding reason which resulted in his move to Goffs Bloodstock Sales in 1974.

=== Goffs ===
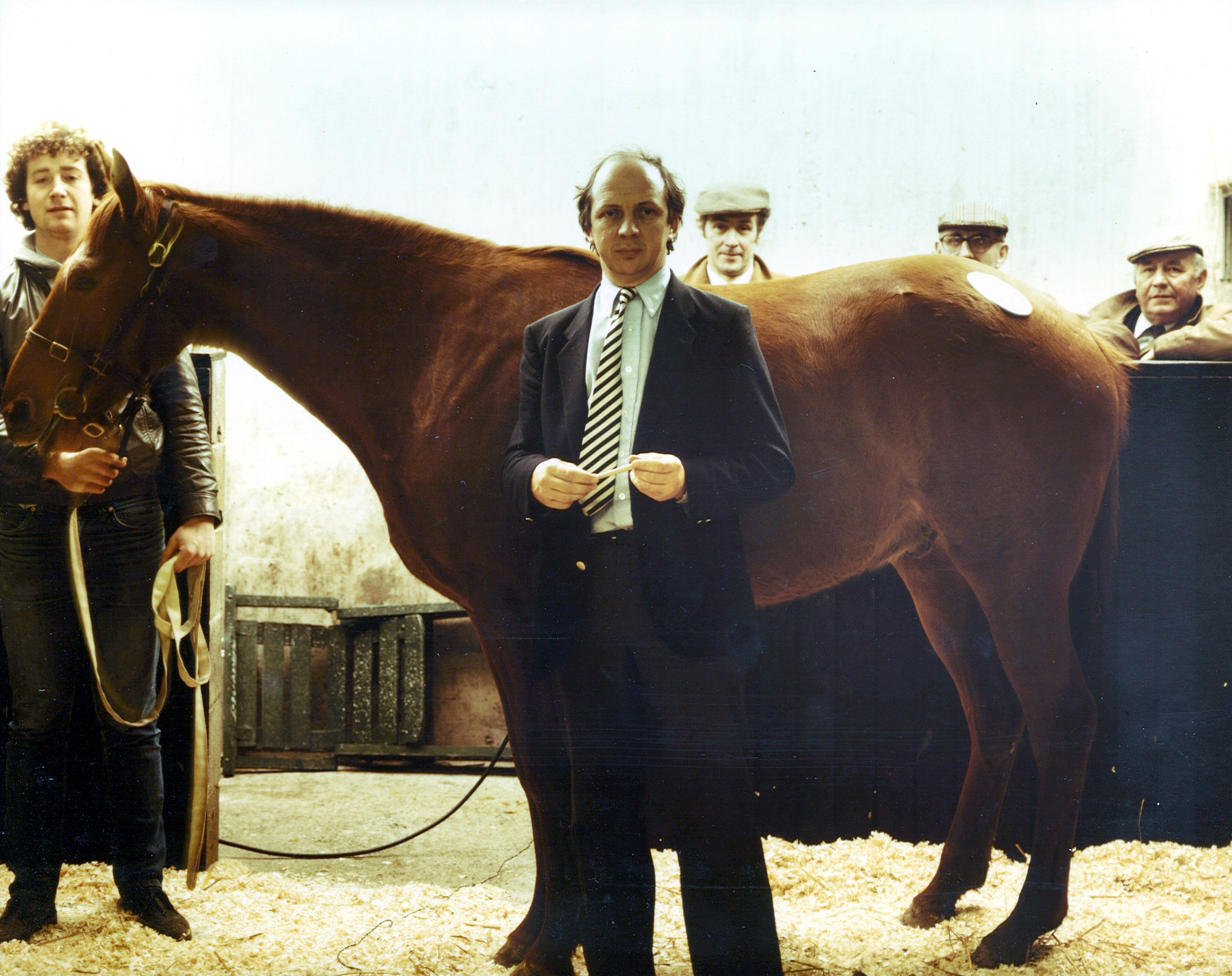
Sunday Times Magazine: Jonathan Irwin, photographed in 1984.

Robert J. Goff established Goffs in 1866 and was the only thoroughbred auction house in the country. Historically the 'cream' of the Irish yearling crop had up to that time been sold in England, at Tattersalls.

In 1974 Irwin was approached by the Irish senator and racing patron Paddy McGrath to manage Goffs, then a small private company on the verge of bankruptcy. In the same year, Goffs were advised by their landlords that their sales complex in Dublin was to be sold. Goffs, who had auctioned at Ballsbridge for more than eighty years, suddenly found themselves siteless when their landlords, the Royal Dublin Society, sold the paddocks to Allied Irish Banks for more than £4 million and then failed to come up with an alternative that satisfied either Goff's or the members of the Irish Bloodstock Breeders Association.

Irwin was an early convert to the Myerscough family's brain-child of moving their sales to Kill, County Kildare. According to Irwin, "as various negotiations continued, it became clear to me that we could not return to the R.D.S. and be beholden to the same landlords as in the past with no security of tenure. I was in Australia when I heard the news that the R.D.S., whose Professor James Meenan had earlier given his blessing to the Kill project, had executed a volte-face and were back in contention."

Irwin felt that action was needed and got in touch with John Finney, an American equine auctioneer firm, who agreed to come in. Thereafter there was no great problem in raising the finance but the group of underwriters had certain reservations about the existing management structure in Goffs. As a compromise, he agreed to take the job. Thus Irwin replaced Robert Myerscough as managing director of R.J. Goff and Co. Ltd. on 1 January 1975 and oversaw the construction of the world's first purpose-built bloodstock sales complex in Kill. The cost of the proposed complex to be built on a 74.6-acre site at Kill was estimated at £1.8 million as far back as August 1974. According to Irwin he didn't want merely the most modern and best equipped sales complex, he also wanted a whole new approach to business within the horse industry. He was mortified "that class distinction should still be so rampant. It is difficult for an outsider to learn even how to buy a horse at a sale. Younger people just have to be attracted and to them and to everybody else my door will always be open."

Irwin's previous experience influenced the company turnover increase from £3.2 million in 1975 to £44 million by 1989.

=== Dublin International Sports Council ===
Irwin was appointed CEO of the Dublin International Sports Council (DISC) in 1993 under the chairmanship of Dr. Tony O'Reilly. The objective of the DISC was to raise Dublin's profile as a host venue for international sports and to lobby the government to provide facilities of international standard. Projects included the 1994 Women's Hockey World Cup, the 1995 Men's EuroHockey Nations Championship, the 1996 Notre Dame vs U.S. Naval Academy football game, and the first three stages of the 1998 Tour de France in Dublin. DISC also produced a research document for Dublin to bid for the 2012 and 2016 Summer Olympics.

=== The Jack and Jill Foundation ===
The Jack and Jill Foundation was established by Irwin and his wife Mary Ann, as a result of their experiences following the birth of their son Jack in 1996. Due to complications shortly after birth, Jack developed severe brain damage, which left him without sight or hearing, and unable to swallow. In a manner that shocked Irwin, he was advised by medical practitioners to abandon the baby in the hospital. After ignoring that advice, they found themselves effectively abandoned instead, with no support system in place to help them care for Jack at home.

The family suffered significant trauma, and encountered a series of bureaucratic obstacles before an offer of help from a retired nurse provided a catalyst which sustained them through the remaining months of their son's short life. Other nurses became involved with Jack's care, and out of the seeds of family anguish, fresh hopes grew for others.

According to Irwin, he was profoundly shocked and angered to discover that there was no respite aid available to parents in their circumstances until the baby reached the age of four. "We wanted to ensure that other families would not have to go through the same sort of ordeal, and we set up the Jack and Jill Children's Foundation to help provide a comprehensive range of support services for babies and their families."

The organisation has campaigned to improve services for young children with disabilities, but Irwin said that progress towards reform of the system has been slow.

Jack and Jill provide a network of support for individual families and, since 1997, has supported 1600 families throughout Ireland. It has raised €36 million from the private sector while receiving €4.5 million from the Irish health service. Awards received include Charity of the Year 2003, Irish Personality of the Year 2004, Irish Fundraiser of 2011 and Global Fundraiser of 2011.

== Politics ==
In May 2015, Irwin joined the newly founded political party Renua, which has just splintered off from Fine Gael. Irwin's wife Mary Ann O'Brien, already a senator, had already joined the party and publicly declared she would stand for the party in the 2016 Irish general election. Irwin also planned to stand as a Renua candidate in that election in the Kildare South constituency, however, in August 2015 Irwin (alongside many other potential candidates that same year) pulled out from that commitment, citing health reasons. Similarly, Mary Ann O'Brien also ultimately did not run in 2016.
