= Shackleton Valley =

Valley in South Georgia

Coordinates: 54°9′S 36°43′W

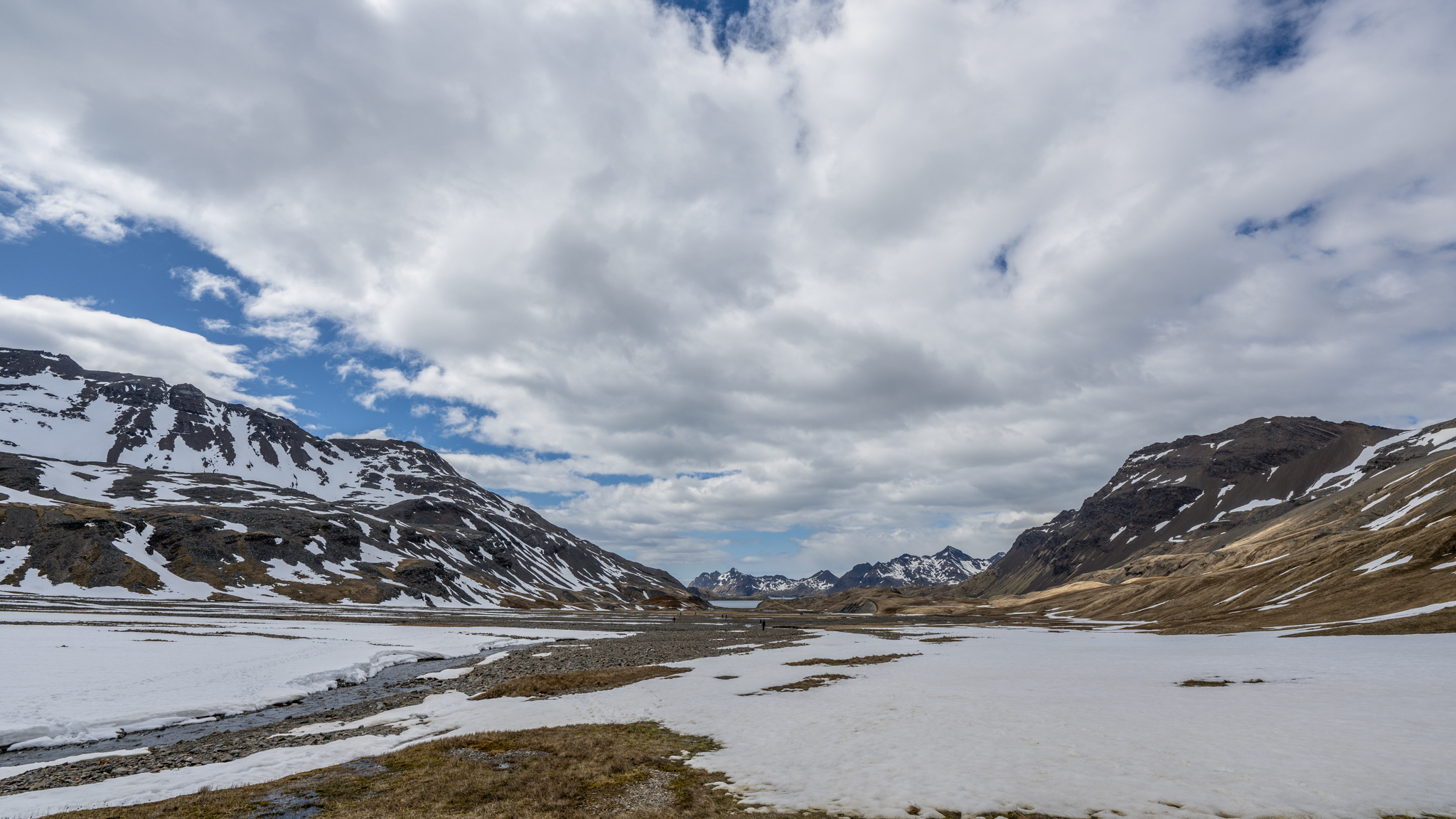
Shakleton Valley (2024)

Shackleton Valley is a broad valley running west-northwest from Stromness Harbor, Stromness Bay, in South Georgia. It was named by the United Kingdom Antarctic Place-Names Committee (UK-APC) after Sir Ernest Henry Shackleton, British Antarctic explorer, whose epic traverse of South Georgia with two of his men, in May 1916, following their boat journey from Elephant Island, ended in this valley. They made contact with Mr. Sorlle, the manager at Stromness whaling station, and then set about organizing the rescue of three of their party from King Haakon Bay, South Georgia, and a further group of men marooned on Elephant Island.
