= Lydia Shackleton =

Irish botanical artist, teacher and poet (1828–1914)

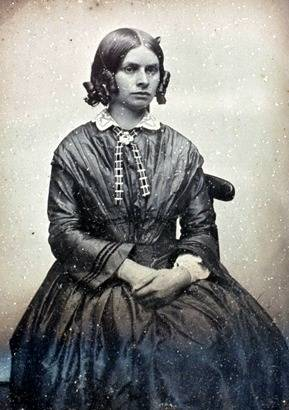
- Born: 22 November 1828; Griesemount House, Ballitore, County Kildare, Ireland
- Died: 10 November 1914 (aged 85); Rathgar, Dublin, County Dublin, Ireland
- Resting place: Friends Burial Ground
- Education: Royal Dublin Society School of Art and Design
- Occupations: Botanical artist; teacher; poet

Lydia Shackleton (22 November 1828 – 10 November 1914) was an Irish botanical artist, teacher, and poet. Shackleton was the first artist-in-residence at the Royal Botanic Gardens in Dublin.

== Early life and education ==
Shackleton was born on 22 November 1828 at Griesemount House in Ballitore, County Kildare to George Shackleton (1785–1871), a miller, and Hannah Shackleton (née Fisher; 1803–1873). The third of the thirteen children, Shackleton was raised in a devot Quaker household. Educated at the Quaker school in her hometown, Shackleton later studied at the Royal Dublin Society School of Art and Design.

== Career ==
Following her studies Shackleton moved to Lucan in County Dublin, where she opened a small school for Quaker children. She taught there for 20 years. She also spent two extended periods in America.

Her earliest surviving works are pencil drawings of Grisemount and Ballitore, dated 15 November 1848. She shared her knowledge and skills with her younger brothers and sisters, and also later taught her nephews and nieces as well. The demands of being one of the eldest in the family, however, meant that she did not indulge her talents as much as she might. Shackleton's views were also more liberal than those of her parents; her disagreement with her mother's more traditional Quaker views led to irreconcilable differences.

=== Artist-in-residence ===
Shackleton painted for 23 years for the Royal Botanic Gardens in Dublin (now the National Botanic Gardens of Ireland), starting in 1884. She and a fellow Quaker named Alice Jacob were both artists-in-residence, though she was the first in that position. Shackleton received no remuneration for her work. She created her paintings on tinted paper, which meant that she had to use white paint for highlighting. Her attention to detail was such that she helpfully taped a pressed flower or leaf to her work for comparison with her painted study.

She is known to have created about 1500 botanical studies, which she signed "L.S.". More than two-thirds of these studies feature orchids. These paintings record the efforts of the gardeners to create new hybrids. Her flower paintings are considered to be botanic studies rather than art studies. Her portrayals at the Botanic Gardens include a significant number of examples of Helleborus, Paeonia, and Sarracenia.

She also painted about 100 Irish native wild species for the Science and Art Museum, Dublin (now the National Museum of Ireland). These paintings are also part of her work at the National Botanic Gardens. This collection is thought to be the largest of her work.

Shackleton was forced to stop painting in 1907 as her sight deteriorated, affecting her ability to execute the fine detail in her work. Her medical condition may have been caused by the exacting nature of her work. She died completely blind, and a spinster, on 10 November 1914 at her home in Rathgar, Dublin. She was buried at the Friends Burial Ground, in Blackrock, Dublin.

== Gallery ==
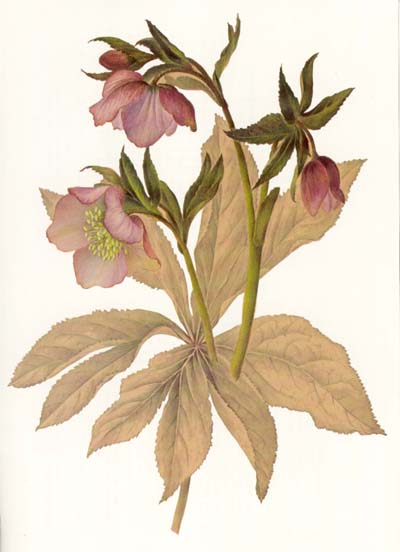
Painting of a hellebore by Lydia Shackleton, gouache and watercolour

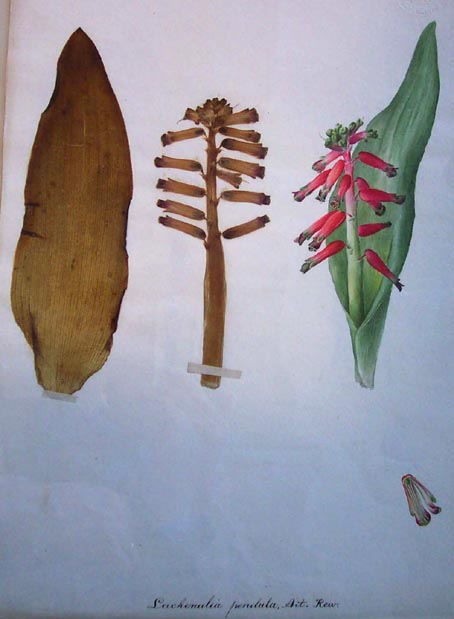
Liliaceae pendula by Lydia Shackleton – dried samples (left) and painting (right)

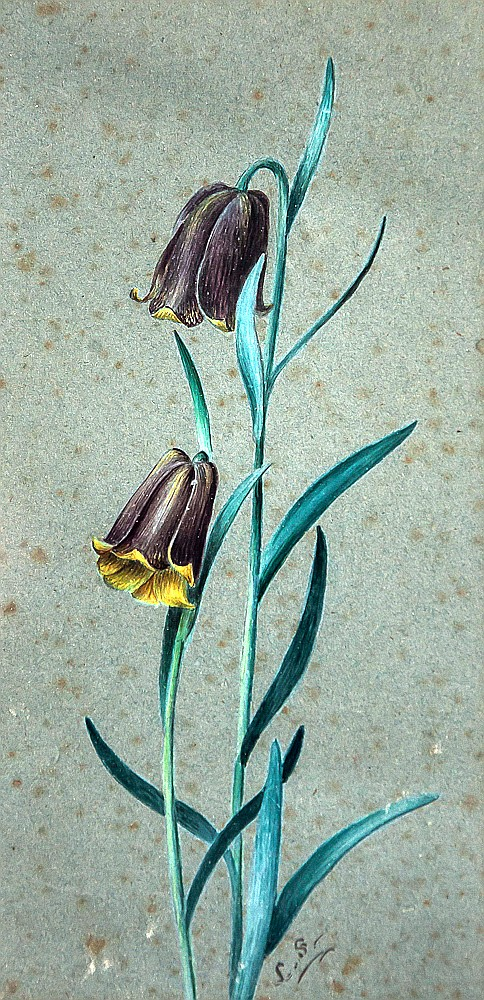
Fritillaria pyrenaica "Mother Ugly"
