= Mary Ann O'Brien =

Irish businesswoman and former politician (born 1960)

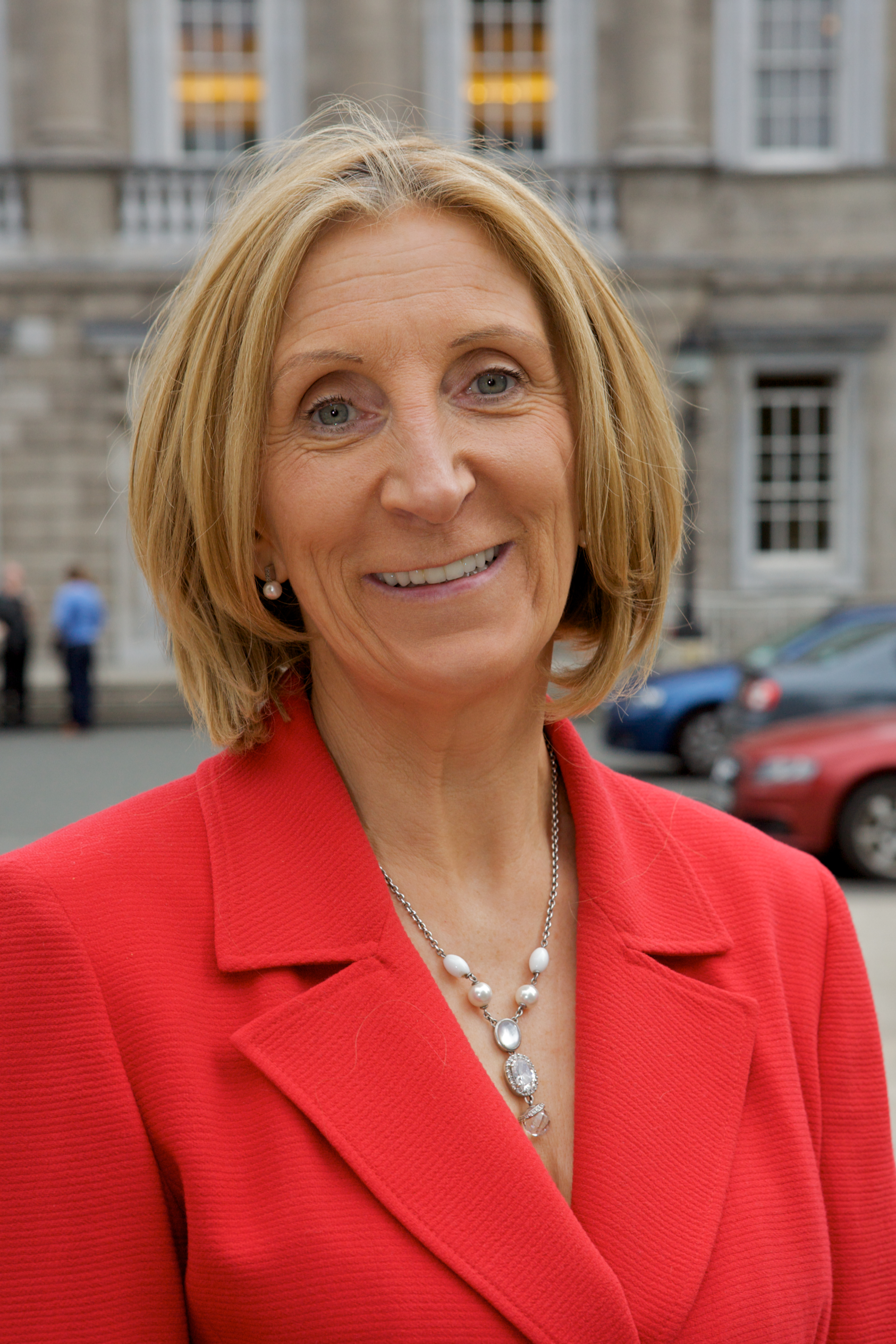
- O'Brien in 2011

Senator
- In office 25 May 2011 – 8 June 2016
- Constituency: Nominated by the Taoiseach

Personal details
- Born: 8 September 1960 (age 65) County Waterford, Ireland
- Party: Renua (March 2015–2016)
- Other political affiliations: Independent
- Spouse: Jonathan Irwin (m. 1991; died 2023)
- Children: 5 (including 2 deceased)
- Parent: Phonsie O'Brien (father)
- Relatives: Vincent O'Brien (uncle)

Mary Ann O'Brien (born 8 September 1960) is an Irish businesswoman and former politician. She is the founder and chairman of Lily O'Brien's Chocolates and in 1997, she founded the Jack and Jill Foundation with her husband Jonathan Irwin, to provide home health care to severely sick babies. It was set up as a direct response to their experience of caring at home for their son Jack, born with severe brain damage in 1996.

O'Brien's family background is in horse racing - her father Phonsie O'Brien and uncle Vincent O'Brien were both notable racehorse trainers.

In May 2011, she was nominated by the Taoiseach Enda Kenny to the 24th Seanad.

At the launch of Renua in March 2015, O'Brien was announced as a party candidate. O'Brien clarified that she would remain independent while a Senator and join Renua to stand at the 2016 general election. However, O'Brien did not contest the 2016 general election.
